= Divergent geometric series =

In mathematics, an infinite geometric series of the form

$$\sum_{n=1}^\infty ar^{n-1} = a + ar + ar^2 + ar^3 +\cdots$$

is divergent if and only if $|r| >= 1.$ Methods for summation of divergent series are sometimes useful, and usually evaluate divergent geometric series to a sum that agrees with the formula for the convergent case

$$\sum_{n=1}^\infty ar^{n-1} = \frac{a}{1-r}.$$

This is true of any summation method that possesses the properties of regularity, linearity, and stability.

== Examples ==
In increasing order of difficulty to sum:

- 1 − 1 + 1 − 1 + ⋯, whose common ratio is −1
- 1 − 2 + 4 − 8 + ⋯, whose common ratio is −2
- 1 + 2 + 4 + 8 + ⋯, whose common ratio is 2
- 1 + 1 + 1 + 1 + ⋯, whose common ratio is 1.

== Motivation for study ==
It is useful to figure out which summation methods produce the geometric series formula for which common ratios. One application for this information is the so-called Borel-Okada principle: If a regular summation method assigns $\sum_{n=0}^{\infty} z^n$ to $1 / (1 - z)$ for all $z$ in a subset $S$ of the complex plane, given certain restrictions on $S$, then the method also gives the analytic continuation of any other function $f(z) = \sum_{n=0}^{\infty} a_n z^n$ on the intersection of $S$ with the Mittag-Leffler star for $f(z)$.

== Summability by region ==
=== Open unit disk ===
Ordinary summation succeeds only for common ratios $|r| < 1.$

=== Closed unit disk ===
- Cesàro summation
- Abel summation

=== Larger disks ===
- Euler summation

=== Half-plane ===
The series is Borel summable for every z with real part < 1.

=== Shadowed plane ===
Certain moment constant methods besides Borel summation can sum the geometric series on the entire Mittag-Leffler star of the function 1/(1 − z), that is, for all z except the ray z ≥ 1.
