= Grandi's series =

Infinite series summing alternating 1 and -1 terms

In mathematics, the infinite series 1 − 1 + 1 − 1 + ⋯ is a divergent series, meaning that the sequence of partial sums of the series does not converge. Although it is divergent, it can be manipulated to yield a number of mathematically interesting results. In particular, various summation methods (techniques for assigning numerical values even to a divergent series) assign this series the value $\tfrac12$.

The series, which can also be written as
$$\sum_{n=0}^\infty (-1)^n,$$
is sometimes called Grandi's series, after Italian mathematician, philosopher, and priest Guido Grandi, who gave a memorable treatment of the series in 1703.

== Nonrigorous methods ==
One obvious method to find the sum of the series
$$1 - 1 + 1 - 1 + 1 - 1 + 1 - 1 + \ldots$$
would be to treat it like a telescoping series and perform the subtractions in place:
$$(1 - 1) + (1 - 1) + (1 - 1) + (1 - 1) + \ldots = 0 + 0 + 0 + 0 + \ldots = 0.$$
On the other hand, a similar bracketing procedure leads to the apparently contradictory result
$$1 + (- 1 + 1) + (- 1 + 1) + (- 1 + 1) + \ldots = 1 + 0 + 0 + 0 + \ldots = 1.$$
Thus, by applying parentheses to Grandi's series in different ways, one can obtain either 0 or 1 as a "value". This is closely akin to the general problem of conditional convergence, and variations of this idea, called the Eilenberg–Mazur swindle, are sometimes used in knot theory and algebra. By taking the average of these two "values", one can justify that the series converges to $\tfrac12$.

Treating Grandi's series as a divergent geometric series and using the same algebraic methods that evaluate convergent geometric series to obtain a third value:

$$\begin{align}
S &= 1 - 1 + 1 - 1 + \ldots, \text{ so} \\
1 - S &= 1 - (1 - 1 + 1 - 1 + \ldots) = 1 - 1 + 1 - 1 + \ldots = S \\
1 - S &= S \\
1 &= 2S,
\end{align}$$

resulting in $S = 1/2$. The same conclusion results from calculating $-S$ (from ($-S = (1 - S) - 1$), subtracting the result from $S$, and solving $2S = 1$.

The above manipulations do not consider what the sum of a series rigorously means and how said algebraic methods can be applied to divergent geometric series. Still, to the extent that it is important to be able to bracket series at will, and that it is more important to be able to perform arithmetic with them, one can arrive at two conclusions:

- The series 1 − 1 + 1 − 1 + ... has no sum.
- ... but its sum should be $\tfrac12$.

In fact, both of these statements can be made precise and formally proven, but only using well-defined mathematical concepts that arose in the 19th century. After the late 17th-century introduction of calculus in Europe, but before the advent of modern rigour, the tension between these answers fueled what has been characterized as an "endless" and "violent" dispute between mathematicians.

== Relation to the geometric series ==
For any number $r$ in the interval $(-1,1)$, the sum to infinity of a geometric series can be evaluated via
$$\lim_{N\to\infty}\sum_{n=0}^N r^n = \sum_{n=0}^\infty r^n=\frac{1}{1-r}.$$
For any $\varepsilon \in (0,2)$, one thus finds
$$\sum_{n=0}^\infty (-1+\varepsilon)^n=\frac{1}{1-(-1+\varepsilon)}=\frac{1}{2-\varepsilon},$$
and so the limit $\varepsilon\to 0$ of series evaluations is
$$\lim_{\varepsilon\to 0}\lim_{N\to\infty}\sum_{n=0}^N (-1+\varepsilon)^n=\frac{1}{2}.$$

However, as mentioned, the series obtained by switching the limits,
$$\lim_{N\to\infty}\lim_{\varepsilon\to 0}\sum_{n=0}^N (-1+\varepsilon)^n = \sum_{n=0}^\infty (-1)^n$$
is divergent.

In the terms of complex analysis, $\tfrac12$ is thus seen to be the value at $z=-1$ of the analytic continuation of the power series $\textstyle \sum_{n=0}^\infty z^n$, which is only defined on the complex unit disk, $\vert z\vert\le 1$.

== Divergence ==
In modern mathematics, the sum of an infinite series is defined to be the limit of the sequence of its partial sums, if it exists. The sequence of partial sums of Grandi's series is 1, 0, 1, 0, ..., which clearly does not approach any number (although it does have two accumulation points at 0 and 1). Therefore, Grandi's series is divergent.

It can be shown that it is not valid to perform many seemingly innocuous operations on a series, such as reordering individual terms, unless the series is absolutely convergent. Otherwise these operations can alter the result of summation. Further, the terms of Grandi's series can be rearranged to have its accumulation points at any interval of two or more consecutive integer numbers, not only 0 or 1. For instance, the series
$$1+1+1+1+1-1-1+1+1-1-1+1+1-1-1+1+1-\cdots$$
(in which, after five initial +1 terms, the terms alternate in pairs of +1 and −1 terms – the infinitude of both +1s and −1s allows any finite number of 1s or −1s to be prepended, by Hilbert's paradox of the Grand Hotel) is a permutation of Grandi's series in which each value in the rearranged series corresponds to a value that is at most four positions away from it in the original series; its accumulation points are 3, 4, and 5.

== Education ==
=== Cognitive impact ===
Around 1987, Anna Sierpińska introduced Grandi's series to a group of 17-year-old precalculus students at a Warsaw lyceum. She focused on humanities students with the expectation that their mathematical experience would be less significant than that of their peers studying mathematics and physics, so the epistemological obstacles they exhibit would be more representative of the obstacles that may still be present in lyceum students.

Sierpińska initially expected the students to balk at assigning a value to Grandi's series, at which point she could shock them by claiming that 1 − 1 + 1 − 1 + ··· = 1/2 as a result of the geometric series formula. Ideally, by searching for the error in reasoning and by investigating the formula for various common ratios, the students would "notice that there are two kinds of series and an implicit conception of convergence will be born". However, the students showed no shock at being told that 1 − 1 + 1 − 1 + ··· = 1/2 or even that 1 + 2 + 4 + 8 + ⋯ = −1. Sierpińska remarks that a priori, the students' reaction shouldn't be too surprising given that Leibniz and Grandi thought 1/2 to be a plausible result;

"A posteriori, however, the explanation of this lack of shock on the part of the students may be somewhat different. They accepted calmly the absurdity because, after all, 'mathematics is completely abstract and far from reality', and 'with those mathematical transformations you can prove all kinds of nonsense', as one of the boys later said."

The students were ultimately not immune to the question of convergence; Sierpińska succeeded in engaging them in the issue by linking it to decimal expansions the following day. As soon as 0.999... = 1 caught the students by surprise, the rest of her material "went past their ears".

=== Preconceptions ===
In another study conducted in Treviso, Italy around the year 2000, third-year and fourth-year Liceo Scientifico pupils (between 16 and 18 years old) were given cards asking the following:

"In 1703, the mathematician Guido Grandi studied the addition: 1 − 1 + 1 − 1 + ... (addends, infinitely many, are always +1 and –1). What is your opinion about it?"

The students had been introduced to the idea of an infinite set, but they had no prior experience with infinite series. They were given ten minutes without books or calculators. The 88 responses were categorized as follows:

- (26) the result is 0
- (18) the result can be either 0 or 1
- (5) the result does not exist
- (4) the result is $\tfrac12$
- (3) the result is 1
- (2) the result is infinite
- (30) no answer

The researcher, Giorgio Bagni, interviewed several of the students to determine their reasoning. Some 16 of them justified an answer of 0 using logic similar to that of Grandi and Riccati. Others justified $\tfrac12$ as being the average of 0 and 1. Bagni notes that their reasoning, while similar to Leibniz's, lacks the probabilistic basis that was so important to 18th-century mathematics. He concludes that the responses are consistent with a link between historical development and individual development, although the cultural context is different.

=== Prospects ===
Joel Lehmann describes the process of distinguishing between different sum concepts as building a bridge over a conceptual crevasse: the confusion over divergence that dogged 18th-century mathematics.

"Since series are generally presented without history and separate from applications, the student must wonder not only "What are these things?" but also "Why are we doing this?" The preoccupation with determining convergence but not the sum makes the whole process seem artificial and pointless to many students—and instructors as well."

As a result, many students develop an attitude similar to Euler's:

"... problems that arise naturally (i.e., from nature) do have solutions, so the assumption that things will work out eventually is justified experimentally without the need for existence sorts of proof. Assume everything is okay, and if the arrived-at solution works, you were probably right, or at least right enough. ... so why bother with the details that only show up in homework problems?"

Lehmann recommends meeting this objection with the same example that was advanced against Euler's treatment of Grandi's series by Jean-Charles Callet. Euler had viewed the sum as the evaluation at x = 1 of the geometric series $1-x+x^2-x^3+\cdots=1/(1+x)$, giving the sum 1/2. However, Callet pointed out that one could instead view Grandi's series as the evaluation at x = 1 of a different series, $1-x^2+x^3-x^5+x^6-\cdots=\tfrac{1+x}{1+x+x^2}$, giving the sum 2/3. Lehman argues that seeing such a conflicting outcome in intuitive evaluations may motivate the need for rigorous definitions and attention to detail.

== Summability ==
=== General considerations ===
==== Stability and linearity ====
The formal manipulations that lead to 1 − 1 + 1 − 1 + ⋯ being assigned a value of $\tfrac12$ include:

- Adding or subtracting two series term-by-term,
- Multiplying through by a scalar term-by-term,
- "Shifting" the series with no change in the sum, and
- Increasing the sum by adding a new term to the series' head.

These are all legal manipulations for sums of convergent series, but 1 − 1 + 1 − 1 + ⋯ is not a convergent series.

Nonetheless, there are many summation methods that respect these manipulations and that do assign a "sum" to Grandi's series. Two of the simplest methods are Cesàro summation and Abel summation.

=== Cesàro sum ===
The first rigorous method for summing divergent series was published by Ernesto Cesàro in 1890. The basic idea is similar to Leibniz's probabilistic approach: essentially, the Cesàro sum of a series is the average of all of its partial sums. Formally one computes, for each $n$, the average $\sigma_n$ of the first $n$ partial sums, and takes the limit of these Cesàro means as $n$ goes to infinity.

For Grandi's series, the sequence of arithmetic means is
$$1,\frac12,\frac23,\frac24,\frac35,\frac36,\frac47,\frac48,\dots$$
or, more suggestively,
$$\left(\frac12+\frac12\right),\frac12,\left(\frac12+\frac16\right),\frac12,\left(\frac12+\frac1{10}\right),\frac12,\left(\frac12+\frac1{14}\right),\frac12,\dots$$
where

$\sigma_n=\frac12$ for even $n$ and $\sigma_n=\frac12+\frac{1}{2n}$ for odd $n$.

This sequence of arithmetic means converges to $\tfrac12$, so the Cesàro sum of $\textstyle\sum a_k$ is $\tfrac12$. Equivalently, one says that the Cesàro limit of the sequence 1, 0, 1, 0, ⋯ is $\tfrac12$.

The Cesàro sum of 1 + 0 − 1 + 1 + 0 − 1 + ⋯ is $\tfrac23$. So the Cesàro sum of a series can be altered by inserting infinitely many 0s as well as infinitely many brackets.

The series can also be summed by the more general fractional (C, a) methods.

=== Abel sum ===
Abel summation is similar to Euler's attempted definition of sums of divergent series, but it avoids Callet's and N. Bernoulli's objections by precisely constructing the function to use. In fact, Euler likely meant to limit his definition to power series, and in practice he used it almost exclusively in a form now known as Abel's method.

Given a series a_{0} + a_{1} + a_{2} + ⋯, one forms a new series a_{0} + a_{1}x + a_{2}x^{2} + ⋯. If the latter series converges for 0 < x < 1 to a function with a limit as x tends to 1, then this limit is called the Abel sum of the original series, after Abel's theorem which guarantees that the procedure is consistent with ordinary summation. For Grandi's series one has

$$A\sum_{n=0}^\infty(-1)^n = \lim_{x\rightarrow 1}\sum_{n=0}^\infty(-x)^n = \lim_{x\rightarrow 1}\frac{1}{1+x}=\frac12.$$

==== Related series ====
The corresponding calculation that the Abel sum of 1 + 0 − 1 + 1 + 0 − 1 + ⋯ is $\tfrac23$ involves the function (1 + x)/(1 + x + x^{2}).

Whenever a series is Cesàro summable, it is also Abel summable and has the same sum. On the other hand, taking the Cauchy product of Grandi's series with itself yields a series which is Abel summable but not Cesàro summable: 1 − 2 + 3 − 4 + ⋯ has Abel sum $\tfrac14$.

=== Dilution ===
==== Alternating spacing ====
That the ordinary Abel sum of 1 + 0 − 1 + 1 + 0 − 1 + ⋯ is $\tfrac23$ can also be phrased as the (A, λ) sum of the original series 1 − 1 + 1 − 1 + ⋯ where (λ_{n}) = (0, 2, 3, 5, 6, ...). Likewise the (A, λ) sum of 1 − 1 + 1 − 1 + ⋯ where (λ_{n}) = (0, 1, 3, 4, 6, ...) is $\tfrac13$.

==== Exponential spacing ====
The summability of 1 − 1 + 1 − 1 + ⋯ can be frustrated by separating its terms with exponentially longer and longer groups of zeros. The simplest example to describe is the series where (−1)^{n} appears in the rank 2^{n}:

$$0 + 1 - 1 + 0 + 1 + 0 + 0 + 0 - 1 + 0 + 0 + 0 + 0 + 0 + 0 + 0 + 1 + 0 + \cdots.$$

This series is not Cesàro summable. After each nonzero term, the partial sums spend enough time lingering at either 0 or 1 to bring the average partial sum halfway to that point from its previous value. Over the interval $2^{2m-1}\le n\le2^{2m}-1$following a $(-1)$ term, the $n$th arithmetic means vary over the range

$$\frac{2}{3} \left(\frac{2^{2m}-1}{2^{2m}+2}\right)\;\mathrm{to}\;\frac{1}{3}(1-2^{-2m}),$$

or about $\tfrac23$ to $\tfrac13$.

In fact, the exponentially spaced series is not Abel summable either. Its Abel sum is the limit as x approaches 1 of the function
$$\begin{align}
F(x)&=0+x-x^2+0+x^4+0+0+0-x^8+\cdots\\
&=\sum_{i=0}^{\infty} (-1)^i x^{2^i}.
\end{align}$$
This function satisfies a functional equation:

$$\begin{array}{rcl}
F(x) & = &\displaystyle x-x^2+x^4-x^8+\cdots \\[1em]
& = & \displaystyle x - \left[(x^2)-(x^2)^2+(x^2)^4-\cdots\right] \\[1em]
& = & \displaystyle x-F(x^2).
\end{array}$$

This functional equation implies that $F(x)$ roughly oscillates around $\tfrac12$ as $x$ approaches 1. To prove that the amplitude of oscillation is nonzero, it helps to separate $F$ into an exactly periodic and an aperiodic part:
$$F(x) = \Psi(x) + \Phi(x)$$
where
$$\Phi(x) = \sum_{n=0}^\infty\frac{(-1)^n}{n!(1+2^n)}\left(\log\frac 1x\right)^n$$
satisfies the same functional equation as $F$. This now implies that $\Psi(x)=-\Psi(x^2)=\Psi(x^4)$, so $\Psi$ is a periodic function of $\log\log\tfrac1x$. G. H. Hardy's paper on divergent series speaks of "another solution" and "plainly not constant", although technically he does not prove that $F$ and $\Phi$ are different. Since the $\Phi$ part has a limit of $\tfrac12$, $F$ oscillates as well.

=== Separation of scales ===
Given any function $\varphi(x)$ such that $\varphi(0)=1$, such that the derivative of $\varphi$ is integrable over $(0,\infty)$, then the generalized $\varphi$-sum of Grandi's series exists and is equal to $\tfrac12$:

$$S_\varphi = \lim_{\delta\downarrow0}\sum_{k=0}^\infty(-1)^k\varphi(\delta k) = \frac12.$$

The Cesàro or Abel sum is recovered by letting $\varphi$ be a triangular or exponential function, respectively. If $\varphi$ is additionally assumed to be continuously differentiable, then the claim can be proved by applying the mean value theorem and converting the sum into an integral. Briefly:

$$\begin{array}{rcl}
S_\varphi & = &\displaystyle \lim_{\delta\downarrow0}\sum_{k=0}^\infty\left[\varphi(2k\delta) - \varphi(2k\delta+\delta)\right] \\[1em]
& = & \displaystyle \lim_{\delta\downarrow0}\sum_{k=0}^\infty\varphi'(2k\delta+c_k)(-\delta) \\[1em]
& = & \displaystyle-\frac12\int_0^\infty\varphi'(x) \,dx = -\frac12\varphi(x)|_0^\infty = \frac12.
\end{array}$$

=== Borel sum ===
The Borel sum of Grandi's series is again $\tfrac12$, since

$$1-x+\frac{x^2}{2!}-\frac{x^3}{3!}+\frac{x^4}{4!}-\cdots=e^{-x}$$
and
$$\int_0^\infty e^{-x}e^{-x}\,dx=\int_0^\infty e^{-2x}\,dx=\frac12.$$

The series can also be summed by generalized (B, r) methods.

=== Spectral asymmetry ===
The entries in Grandi's series can be paired to the eigenvalues of an infinite-dimensional operator on Hilbert space. Giving the series this interpretation gives rise to the idea of spectral asymmetry, which occurs widely in physics. The value that the series sums to depends on the asymptotic behaviour of the eigenvalues of the operator. Thus, for example, let $\{\omega_n\}$ be a sequence of both positive and negative eigenvalues. Grandi's series corresponds to the formal sum

$$\sum_n \sgn(\omega_n)\;$$

where $\sgn(\omega_n)=\pm 1$ is the sign of the eigenvalue. The series can be given concrete values by considering various limits. For example, the heat kernel regulator leads to the sum

$$\lim_{t\to 0} \sum_n \sgn(\omega_n) e^{-t|\omega_n|}$$

which, for many interesting cases, is finite for non-zero t, and converges to a finite value in the limit.

=== Methods that fail ===
The integral function method with p_{n} = exp (−cn^{2}) and c > 0.

The moment constant method with

$$d\chi = e^{-k(\log x)^2}x^{-1}dx$$

and k > 0.

==== Geometric series ====
The geometric series in $(x - 1)$,

$$\frac{1}{x} = 1 - (x-1) + (x-1)^2 - (x-1)^3 + (x-1)^4 - .. .$$

is convergent for $|x - 1| < 1$. Formally substituting $x = 2$ would give

$$\frac{1}{2} = 1 - 1 + 1 - 1 + 1 - ...$$

However, $x = 2$ is outside the radius of convergence, $|x - 1| < 1$, so this conclusion cannot be made.

== Related problems ==
The series 1 − 2 + 3 − 4 + 5 − 6 + 7 − 8 + ... (up to infinity) is also divergent, but some methods may be used to sum it to $\tfrac14$. This is the square of the value most summation methods assign to Grandi's series, which is reasonable as it can be viewed as the Cauchy product of two copies of Grandi's series, which is 1 − 2 + 3 − 4 + ⋯.

=== Parables ===
Guido Grandi illustrated the series with a parable involving two brothers who share a gem.

Thomson's lamp is a supertask in which a hypothetical lamp is turned on and off infinitely many times in a finite time span. One can think of turning the lamp on as adding 1 to its state, and turning it off as subtracting 1. Instead of asking the sum of the series, one asks the final state of the lamp.

One of the best-known classic parables to which infinite series have been applied, Achilles and the tortoise, can also be adapted to the case of Grandi's series.

=== Numerical series ===
Grandi's series is just one example of a divergent geometric series.

The rearranged series 1 − 1 − 1 + 1 + 1 − 1 − 1 + ⋯ occurs in Euler's 1775 treatment of the pentagonal number theorem as the value of the Euler function at q = 1.

=== Power series ===
The power series most famously associated with Grandi's series is its ordinary generating function,

$$f(x) = 1-x+x^2-x^3+\cdots = \frac{1}{1+x}.$$

=== Fourier series ===
==== Hyperbolic sine ====
In his 1822 Théorie Analytique de la Chaleur, Joseph Fourier obtains what is currently called a Fourier sine series for a scaled version of the hyperbolic sine function,

$$f(x) = \frac{\pi}{2\sinh\pi} \sinh x.$$

He finds that the general coefficient of sin nx in the series is

$$(-1)^{n-1}\left(\frac 1 n - \frac{1}{n^3} + \frac{1}{n^5} - \cdots\right) = (-1)^{n-1}\frac{n}{1+n^2}.$$

For n > 1 the above series converges, while the coefficient of sin x appears as 1 − 1 + 1 − 1 + ⋯ and so is expected to be $\tfrac12$. In fact, this is correct, as can be demonstrated by directly calculating the Fourier coefficient from an integral:

$$\frac 2 \pi \int_0^\pi f(x)\sin x \;dx = \left.\frac 1 {2\sinh\pi}(\cosh x \sin x - \sinh x \cos x)\right|_0^\pi = \frac 1 2.$$

==== Dirac comb ====
Grandi's series occurs more directly in another important series,

$$\cos x + \cos 2x + \cos 3x + \cdots = \sum_{k=1}^\infty\cos(kx).$$

At x = π, the series reduces to −1 + 1 − 1 + 1 - ⋯ and so one might expect it to meaningfully equal $-\tfrac12$. In fact, Euler held that this series obeyed the formal relation $\textstyle\sum\cos kx=-\tfrac12$, while d'Alembert rejected the relation, and Lagrange wondered if it could be defended by an extension of the geometric series similar to Euler's reasoning with Grandi's numerical series.

Euler's claim suggests that

$$1 +2\sum_{k=1}^\infty\cos(kx) = 0?$$

for all x. This series is divergent everywhere, while its Cesàro sum is indeed 0 for almost all x. However, the series diverges to infinity at x = 2πn in a significant way: it is the Fourier series of a Dirac comb. The ordinary, Cesàro, and Abel sums of this series involve limits of the Dirichlet, Fejér, and Poisson kernels, respectively.

=== Dirichlet series ===
Multiplying the terms of Grandi's series by 1/n^{z} yields the Dirichlet series

$$\eta(z)=1-\frac{1}{2^z}+\frac{1}{3^z}-\frac{1}{4^z}+\cdots=\sum_{n=1}^\infty\frac{(-1)^{n-1}}{n^z},$$

which converges only for complex numbers z with a positive real part. Grandi's series is recovered by letting z = 0.

Unlike the geometric series, the Dirichlet series for η is not useful for determining what 1 − 1 + 1 − 1 + · · · "should" be. Even on the right half-plane, η(z) is not given by any elementary expression, and there is no immediate evidence of its limit as z approaches 0. On the other hand, if one uses stronger methods of summability, then the Dirichlet series for η defines a function on the whole complex plane — the Dirichlet eta function — and moreover, this function is analytic. For z with real part > −1 it suffices to use Cesàro summation, and so $\eta(0)=\tfrac12$ after all.

The function η is related to a more famous Dirichlet series and function:

$$\begin{align}
\eta(z) & = 1+\frac 1 {2^z}+\frac 1 {3^z}+\frac 1 {4^z}+\cdots - \frac 2 {2^z} \left(1+\frac 1 {2^z}+\cdots\right) \\[5pt]
& = \left(1-\frac 2 {2^z}\right)\zeta(z),
\end{align}$$

where ζ is the Riemann zeta function. Keeping Grandi's series in mind, this relation explains why $\zeta(0)=-\tfrac12$; see also 1 + 1 + 1 + 1 + · · ·. The relation also implies a much more important result. Since $\eta(z)$ and $1-2^{1-z}$ are both analytic on the entire plane and the latter function's only zero is a simple zero at $z=1$, it follows that $\zeta(z)$ is meromorphic with only a simple pole at $z=1$.

=== Euler characteristics ===
Given a CW complex S containing one vertex, one edge, one face, and generally exactly one cell of every dimension, Euler's formula V − E + F − · · · for the Euler characteristic of S returns 1 − 1 + 1 − · · ·. There are a few motivations for defining a generalized Euler characteristic for such a space that turns out to be 1/2.

One approach comes from combinatorial geometry. The open interval (0, 1) has an Euler characteristic of −1, so its power set 2^{(0, 1)} should have an Euler characteristic of 2^{−1} = 1/2. The appropriate power set to take is the "small power set" of finite subsets of the interval, which consists of the union of a point (the empty set), an open interval (the set of singletons), an open triangle, and so on. So the Euler characteristic of the small power set is 1 − 1 + 1 − · · ·. James Propp defines a regularized Euler measure for polyhedral sets that, in this example, replaces 1 − 1 + 1 − · · · with 1 − t + t^{2} − · · ·, sums the series for |t| < 1, and analytically continues to t = 1, essentially finding the Abel sum of 1 − 1 + 1 − · · ·, which is 1/2. Generally, he finds χ(2^{A}) = 2^{χ(A)} for any polyhedral set A, and the base of the exponent generalizes to other sets as well.

Infinite-dimensional real projective space RP^{∞} is another structure with one cell of every dimension and therefore an Euler characteristic of 1 − 1 + 1 − · · ·. This space can be described as the quotient of the infinite-dimensional sphere by identifying each pair of antipodal points. Since the infinite-dimensional sphere is contractible, its Euler characteristic is 1, and its 2-to-1 quotient should have an Euler characteristic of 1/2.

This description of RP^{∞} also makes it the classifying space of Z_{2}, the cyclic group of order 2. Tom Leinster gives a definition of the Euler characteristic of any category which bypasses the classifying space and reduces to 1/|G| for any group when viewed as a one-object category. In this sense the Euler characteristic of Z_{2} is itself $\tfrac12$.

=== In physics ===
Grandi's series, and generalizations thereof, occur frequently in many branches of physics; most typically in the discussions of quantized fermion fields (for example, the chiral bag model), which have both positive and negative eigenvalues; although similar series occur also for bosons, such as in the Casimir effect.

The general series is discussed in greater detail in the article on spectral asymmetry, whereas methods used to sum it are discussed in the articles on regularization and, in particular, the zeta function regulator.

=== In art ===
The Grandi series has been applied to e.g. ballet by Benjamin Jarvis, in The Invariant Journal. PDF here: https://invariants.org.uk/assets/TheInvariant_HT2016.pdf

The noise artist Jliat has a 2000 musical single Still Life #7: The Grandi Series advertised as "conceptual art"; it consists of nearly an hour of silence.

== See also ==
- 1 − 1 + 2 − 6 + 24 − 120 + ⋯
- 1 + 1 + 1 + 1 + ⋯
- 1 − 2 + 3 − 4 + ⋯
- 1 + 2 + 3 + 4 + ⋯
- 1 + 2 + 4 + 8 + ⋯
- 1 − 2 + 4 − 8 + ⋯
- Cesàro summation
- Ramanujan summation
- Riemann series theorem, classification according to whether regrouping can change the sum
- Thomson's lamp
