= 1 − 2 + 3 − 4 + ⋯ =

Infinite series with alternating signs

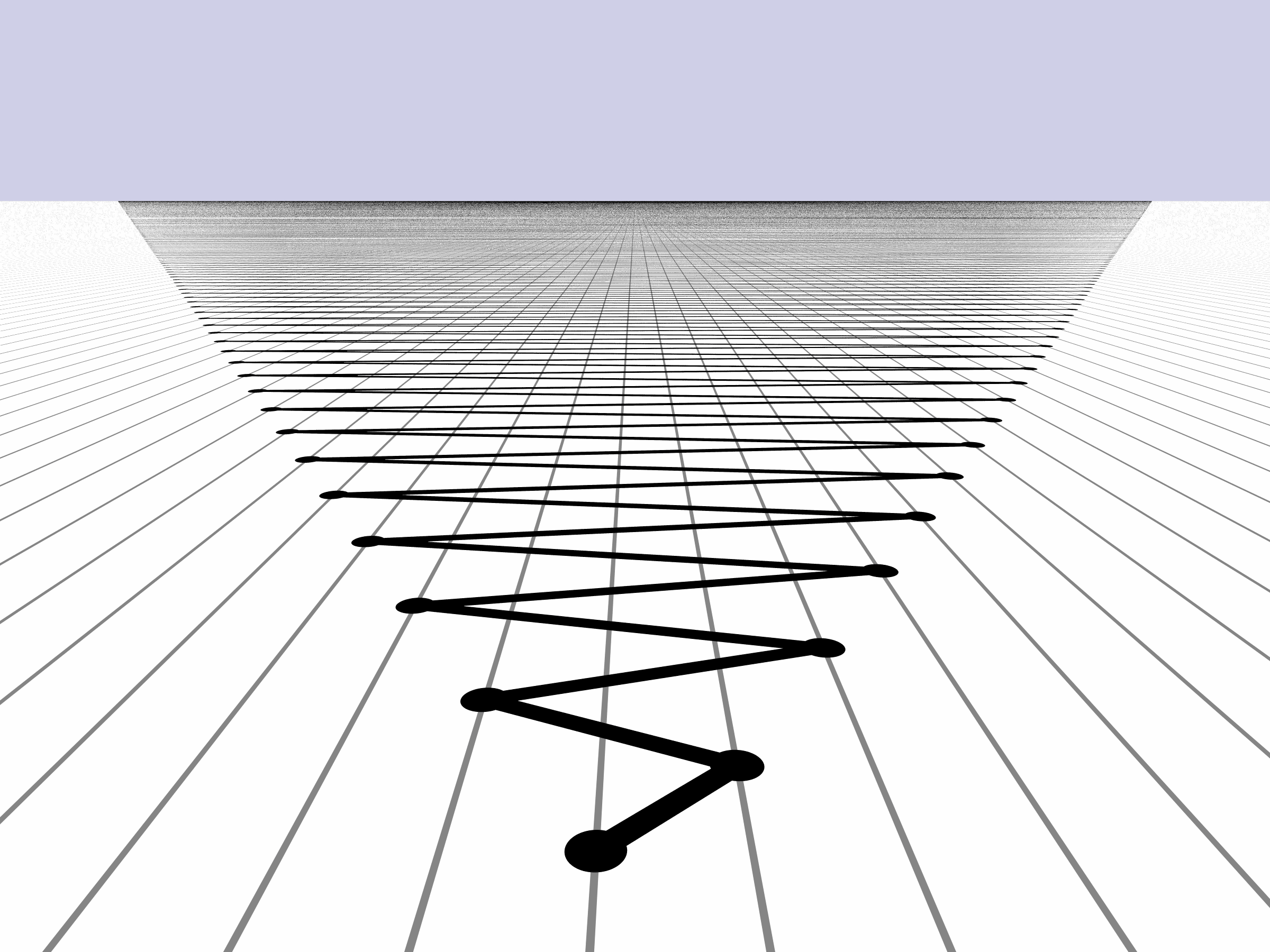
The first 15,000 partial sums of 0 + 1 − 2 + 3 − 4 + ... The graph is situated with positive integers to the right and negative integers to the left.

In mathematics, 1 − 2 + 3 − 4 + ··· is an infinite series whose terms are the successive positive integers, given alternating signs. Using sigma summation notation the sum of the first m terms of the series can be expressed as
$$\sum_{n=1}^m n(-1)^{n-1}.$$

The infinite series diverges, meaning that its sequence of partial sums, (1, −1, 2, −2, 3, ...), does not tend towards any finite limit. Nonetheless, in the mid-18th century, Leonhard Euler wrote what he admitted to be a paradoxical equation:
$$1-2+3-4+\cdots=\frac{1}{4}.$$

A rigorous explanation of this equation would not arrive until much later. Starting in 1890, Ernesto Cesàro, Émile Borel and others investigated well-defined methods to assign generalized sums to divergent series—including new interpretations of Euler's attempts. Many of these summability methods easily assign to 1 − 2 + 3 − 4 + ... a "value" of 1/4. Cesàro summation is one of the few methods that do not sum 1 − 2 + 3 − 4 + ..., so the series is an example where a slightly stronger method, such as Abel summation, is required.

The series 1 − 2 + 3 − 4 + ... is closely related to Grandi's series 1 − 1 + 1 − 1 + .... Euler treated these two as special cases of the more general sequence 1 − 2^{n} + 3^{n} − 4^{n} + ..., where n = 1 and n = 0 respectively. This line of research extended his work on the Basel problem and leading towards the functional equations of what are now known as the Dirichlet eta function and the Riemann zeta function.

== Divergence ==
The series' terms (1, −2, 3, −4, ...) do not approach 0; therefore 1 − 2 + 3 − 4 + ... diverges by the term test. Divergence can also be shown directly from the definition: an infinite series converges if and only if the sequence of partial sums converges to a limit, in which case that limit is the value of the infinite series. The partial sums of 1 − 2 + 3 − 4 + ... are:

1,

1 − 2 = −1,
1 − 2 + 3 = 2,
1 − 2 + 3 − 4 = −2,
1 − 2 + 3 − 4 + 5 = 3,
1 − 2 + 3 − 4 + 5 − 6 = −3,

...

The sequence of partial sums shows that the series does not converge to a particular number: for any proposed limit x, there exists a point beyond which the subsequent partial sums are all outside the interval [x − 1, x + 1], so 1 − 2 + 3 − 4 + ... diverges.

The partial sums include every integer exactly once—even 0 if one counts the empty partial sum—and thereby establishes the countability of the set $\Z$ of integers.

== Heuristics for summation ==
=== Stability and linearity ===
Since the terms 1, −2, 3, −4, 5, −6, ... follow a simple pattern, the series 1 − 2 + 3 − 4 + ... can be manipulated by shifting and term-by-term addition to yield a numerical value. If it can make sense to write s = 1 − 2 + 3 − 4 + ... for some ordinary number s, the following manipulations argue for s = 1/4:
$$\begin{alignat}{5}
4s&=         &&(1-2+3-\cdots) \ \ &&{}+(1-2+3-4+\cdots)        && {}+(1-2+3-4+\cdots)      &&{}+(1-2+3-4+\cdots) \\
&=         &&(1-2+3-\cdots)     && +1 {}+(-2+3-4+\cdots) \ \ && {}+1+(-2+3-4+\cdots) \ \ &&{}+1-2+(3-4+\cdots) \\
&=\ 1+{}   &&(1-2+3-\cdots)     && {}+(-2+3-4+\cdots)        && {}+(-2+3-4+\cdots)       &&{}+(3-4+5-\cdots) \\
&=\ 1+{}[\ &&(1-2-2+3)            && {}+(-2+3+3-4)             && {}+(3-4-4+5)           &&{}+\cdots \ ] \\
&=\ 1+{}[\ && 0+0+0+\cdots\ ] \\
4s&=\ 1
\end{alignat}$$

Adding 4 copies of 1 − 2 + 3 − 4 + ..., using only shifts and term-by-term addition, yields 1. The left side and right side each demonstrates two copies of 1 − 2 + 3 − 4 + ... adding to 1 − 1 + 1 − 1 + ....

So $s=\frac{1}{4}$.

Although 1 − 2 + 3 − 4 + ... does not have a sum in the usual sense, the equation s = 1 − 2 + 3 − 4 + ... = 1/4 can be supported as the most natural answer if such a sum is to be defined. A generalized definition of the "sum" of a divergent series is called a summation method or summability method. There are many different methods and it is desirable that they share some properties of ordinary summation. What the above manipulations actually prove is the following: Given any summability method that is linear and stable and sums the series 1 − 2 + 3 − 4 + ..., the sum it produces is 1/4. Furthermore, since
$$\begin{alignat}{5}
2s&=        &&(1-2+3-4+\cdots) \ \       &&{}+(1-2+3-4+5-\cdots) \\
&=        && 1 {}+(-2+3-4+\cdots) \ \ &&{}+1-2+(3-4+5-\cdots) \\
&=\ 0+{} &&(-2+3-4+\cdots)          &&{}+(3-4+5-\cdots) \\
&=\ 0+{}[\ &&(-2+3) \quad  {}+(3-4)  && {}+(-4+5) \quad +\cdots \ ] \\
2s&=\       && 1-1+1-1+\cdots
\end{alignat}$$
such a method must also sum Grandi's series as 1 − 1 + 1 − 1 + ... = 1/2.

=== Cauchy product ===
In 1891, Ernesto Cesàro expressed hope that divergent series would be rigorously brought into calculus, pointing out, "One already writes (1 − 1 + 1 − 1 + ...)^{2} = 1 − 2 + 3 − 4 + ... and asserts that both the sides are equal to 1/4." For Cesàro, this equation was an application of a theorem he had published the previous year, which is the first theorem in the history of summable divergent series. The details on his summation method are below; the central idea is that 1 − 2 + 3 − 4 + ... is the Cauchy product (discrete convolution) of 1 − 1 + 1 − 1 + ... with 1 − 1 + 1 − 1 + ....

The Cauchy product of two infinite series is defined even when both of them are divergent. In the case where a_{n} = b_{n} = (−1)^{n}, the terms of the Cauchy product are given by the finite diagonal sums
$$\begin{align}
c_n & =  \sum_{k=0}^n a_k b_{n-k}=\sum_{k=0}^n (-1)^k (-1)^{n-k} \\
& =  \sum_{k=0}^n (-1)^n = (-1)^n(n+1).
\end{align}$$

The product series is then
$$\sum_{n=0}^\infty(-1)^n(n+1) = 1-2+3-4+\cdots.$$

Thus a summation method that respects the Cauchy product of two series — and assigns to the series 1 − 1 + 1 − 1 + ... the sum 1/2 — will also assign to the series 1 − 2 + 3 − 4 + ... the sum 1/4. With the result of the previous section, this implies an equivalence between summability of 1 − 1 + 1 − 1 + ... and 1 − 2 + 3 − 4 + ... with methods that are linear, stable, and respect the Cauchy product.

Cesàro's theorem is a subtle example. The series 1 − 1 + 1 − 1 + ... is Cesàro-summable in the weakest sense, called (C, 1)-summable, while 1 − 2 + 3 − 4 + ... requires a stronger form of Cesàro's theorem, being (C, 2)-summable. Since all forms of Cesàro's theorem are linear and stable, the values of the sums are as calculated above.

== Specific methods ==
=== Cesàro and Hölder ===
Data about the (H, 2) sum of 1/4

To find the (C, 1) Cesàro sum of 1 − 2 + 3 − 4 + ..., if it exists, one needs to compute the arithmetic means of the partial sums of the series. The partial sums are:

1, −1, 2, −2, 3, −3, ...,

and the arithmetic means of these partial sums are:

1, 0, 2/3, 0, 3/5, 0, 4/7, ....

This sequence of means does not converge, so 1 − 2 + 3 − 4 + ... is not Cesàro summable.

There are two well-known generalizations of Cesàro summation: the conceptually simpler of these is the sequence of (H, n) methods for natural numbers n. The (H, 1) sum is Cesàro summation, and higher methods repeat the computation of means. Above, the even means converge to 1/2, while the odd means are all equal to 0, so the means of the means converge to the average of 0 and 1/2, namely 1/4. So 1 − 2 + 3 − 4 + ... is (H, 2) summable to 1/4.

The "H" stands for Otto Hölder, who first proved in 1882 what mathematicians now think of as the connection between Abel summation and (H, n) summation; 1 − 2 + 3 − 4 + ... was his first example. The fact that 1/4 is the (H, 2) sum of 1 − 2 + 3 − 4 + ... guarantees that it is the Abel sum as well; this will also be proved directly below.

The other commonly formulated generalization of Cesàro summation is the sequence of (C, n) methods. It has been proven that (C, n) summation and (H, n) summation always give the same results, but they have different historical backgrounds. In 1887, Cesàro came close to stating the definition of (C, n) summation, but he gave only a few examples. In particular, he summed 1 − 2 + 3 − 4 + ..., to 1/4 by a method that may be rephrased as (C, n) but was not justified as such at the time. He formally defined the (C, n) methods in 1890 in order to state his theorem that the Cauchy product of a (C, n)-summable series and a (C, m)-summable series is (C, m + n + 1)-summable.

=== Abel summation ===
Some partials of 1 − 2x + 3x^{2} + ...; 1/(1 + x)^{2}; and limits at 1

In a 1749 report, Leonhard Euler acknowledges that the series diverges but prepares to sum it anyway:

... when it is said that the sum of this series 1 − 2 + 3 − 4 + 5 − 6 etc. is 1/4, that must appear paradoxical. For by adding 100 terms of this series, we get −50, however, the sum of 101 terms gives +51, which is quite different from 1/4 and becomes still greater when one increases the number of terms. But I have already noticed at a previous time, that it is necessary to give to the word sum a more extended meaning ...

Euler proposed a generalization of the word "sum" several times. In the case of 1 − 2 + 3 − 4 + ..., his ideas are similar to what is now known as Abel summation:

... it is no more doubtful that the sum of this series 1 − 2 + 3 − 4 + 5 etc. is 1/4; since it arises from the expansion of the formula 1/((1+1)^{2}), whose value is incontestably 1/4. The idea becomes clearer by considering the general series 1 − 2x + 3x^{2} − 4x^{3} + 5x^{4} − 6x^{5} + &c. that arises while expanding the expression 1/((1+x)^{2}), which this series is indeed equal to after we set x = 1.

There are many ways to see that, at least for absolute values |x| < 1, Euler is right in that
$$1-2x+3x^2-4x^3+\cdots = \frac{1}{(1+x)^2}.$$
One can take the Taylor expansion of the right-hand side, or apply the formal long division process for polynomials. Starting from the left-hand side, one can follow the general heuristics above and try multiplying by (1 + x) twice or squaring the geometric series 1 − x + x^{2} − .... Euler also seems to suggest differentiating the latter series term by term.

In the modern view, the generating function 1 − 2x + 3x^{2} − 4x^{3} + ... does not define a function at x = 1, so that value cannot simply be substituted into the resulting expression. Since the function is defined for all |x| < 1, one can still take the limit as x approaches 1, and this is the definition of the Abel sum:
$$\lim_{x\rightarrow 1^{-}}\sum_{n=1}^\infty n(-x)^{n-1} = \lim_{x\rightarrow 1^{-}}\frac{1}{(1+x)^2} = \frac14.$$

=== Euler and Borel ===
Euler summation to 1/2 − 1/4. Positive values are shown in white, negative values are shown in brown, and shifts and cancellations are shown in green.

Euler applied another technique to the series: the Euler transform, one of his own inventions. To compute the Euler transform, one begins with the sequence of positive terms that makes up the alternating series—in this case 1, 2, 3, 4, .... The first element of this sequence is labeled a_{0}.

Next one needs the sequence of forward differences among 1, 2, 3, 4, ...; this is just 1, 1, 1, 1, .... The first element of this sequence is labeled Δa_{0}. The Euler transform also depends on differences of differences, and higher iterations, but all the forward differences among 1, 1, 1, 1, ... are 0. The Euler transform of 1 − 2 + 3 − 4 + ... is then defined as
$$\frac12 a_0-\frac14\Delta a_0 +\frac18\Delta^2 a_0 -\cdots = \frac12-\frac14.$$

In modern terminology, one says that 1 − 2 + 3 − 4 + ... is Euler summable to 1/4.

The Euler summability also implies Borel summability, with the same summation value, as it does in general.

=== Separation of scales ===
Saichev and Woyczyński arrive at 1 − 2 + 3 − 4 + ... = 1/4 by applying only two physical principles: infinitesimal relaxation and separation of scales. To be precise, these principles lead them to define a broad family of "φ-summation methods", all of which sum the series to 1/4:

- If φ(x) is a function whose first and second derivatives are continuous and integrable over (0, ∞), such that φ(0) = 1 and the limits of φ(x) and xφ(x) at +∞ are both 0, then
  $$\lim_{\delta\rightarrow0}\sum_{m=0}^\infty (-1)^m(m+1)\varphi(\delta m) = \frac14.$$

This result generalizes Abel summation, which is recovered by letting φ(x) = exp(−x). The general statement can be proved by pairing up the terms in the series over m and converting the expression into a Riemann integral. For the latter step, the corresponding proof for 1 − 1 + 1 − 1 + ... applies the mean value theorem, but here one needs the stronger Lagrange form of Taylor's theorem.

== Generalization ==
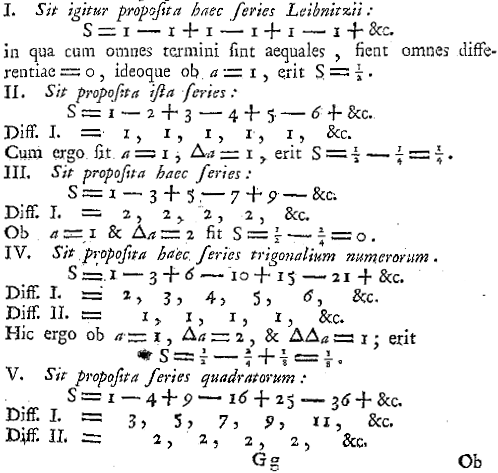
Excerpt from p. 233 of the E212 — Institutiones calculi differentialis cum eius usu in analysi finitorum ac doctrina serierum. Euler sums similar series, c. 1755.

The threefold Cauchy product of 1 − 1 + 1 − 1 + ... is 1 − 3 + 6 − 10 + ..., the alternating series of triangular numbers; its Abel and Euler sum is 1/8. The fourfold Cauchy product of 1 − 1 + 1 − 1 + ... is 1 − 4 + 10 − 20 + ..., the alternating series of tetrahedral numbers, whose Abel sum is 1/16.

Another generalization of 1 − 2 + 3 − 4 + ... in a slightly different direction is the series 1 − 2^{n} + 3^{n} − 4^{n} + ... for other values of n. For positive integers n, these series have the following Abel sums:
$$1-2^{n}+3^{n}-\cdots = \frac{2^{n+1}-1}{n+1}B_{n+1}$$
where B_{n} are the Bernoulli numbers. For even n, this reduces to
$$1-2^{2k}+3^{2k}-\cdots = 0,$$
which can be interpreted as stating that negative even values of the Riemann zeta function are zero. This sum became an object of particular ridicule by Niels Henrik Abel in 1826:

Divergent series are on the whole devil's work, and it is a shame that one dares to found any proof on them. One can get out of them what one wants if one uses them, and it is they which have made so much unhappiness and so many paradoxes. Can one think of anything more appalling than to say that

0 = 1 − 2^{2n} + 3^{2n} − 4^{2n} + etc.

where n is a positive number. Here's something to laugh at, friends.

Cesàro's teacher, Eugène Charles Catalan, also disparaged divergent series. Under Catalan's influence, Cesàro initially referred to the "conventional formulas" for 1 − 2^{n} + 3^{n} − 4^{n} + ... as "absurd equalities", and in 1883 Cesàro expressed a typical view of the time that the formulas were false but still somehow formally useful. Finally, in his 1890 Sur la multiplication des séries, Cesàro took a modern approach starting from definitions.

The series are also studied for non-integer values of n; these make up the Dirichlet eta function. Part of Euler's motivation for studying series related to 1 − 2 + 3 − 4 + ... was the functional equation of the eta function, which leads directly to the functional equation of the Riemann zeta function. Euler had already become famous for finding the values of these functions at positive even integers (including the Basel problem), and he was attempting to find the values at the positive odd integers (including Apéry's constant) as well, a problem that remains elusive today. The eta function in particular is easier to deal with by Euler's methods because its Dirichlet series is Abel summable everywhere; the zeta function's Dirichlet series is much harder to sum where it diverges. For example, the counterpart of 1 − 2 + 3 − 4 + ... in the zeta function is the non-alternating series 1 + 2 + 3 + 4 + ..., which has deep applications in modern physics but requires much stronger methods to sum.

== See also ==
- 1 + 2 + 3 + 4 + ⋯
- 1 + 1 + 1 + 1 + ⋯
- 1 + 2 + 4 + 8 + ⋯
- 1 − 2 + 4 − 8 + ⋯

== Bibliography ==
- Alabdulmohsin, Ibrahim M. (2018). "Analytic summability theory". Summability Calculus. Springer International Publishing. pp. 65–91. doi:10.1007/978-3-319-74648-7_4. ISBN 978-3-319-74647-0.
- Beals, Richard (2004). Analysis: An Introduction. Cambridge UP. ISBN 978-0-521-60047-7.
- Davis, Harry F. (May 1989). Fourier Series and Orthogonal Functions. Dover. ISBN 978-0-486-65973-2.
- Euler, Leonhard; Willis, Lucas; Osler, Thomas J. (2006). "Translation with notes of Euler's paper: Remarks on a beautiful relation between direct as well as reciprocal power series". The Euler Archive. Originally published as Euler, Leonhard (1768). "Remarques sur un beau rapport entre les séries des puissances tant directes que réciproques". Mémoires de l'Académie des Sciences de Berlin. 17: 83–106.
- Ferraro, Giovanni (June 1999). "The First Modern Definition of the Sum of a Divergent Series: An Aspect of the Rise of 20th Century Mathematics". Archive for History of Exact Sciences. 54 (2): 101–135. doi:10.1007/s004070050036. S2CID 119766124.
- Grattan-Guinness, Ivor (1970). The development of the foundations of mathematical analysis from Euler to Riemann. MIT Press. ISBN 978-0-262-07034-8.
- Hardy, G. H. (1949). Divergent Series. Clarendon Press. LCCN 49005496. MR 0030620. OCLC 808787. 2nd Ed. published by Chelsea Pub. Co., 1991. LCCN 91-75377. ISBN 0-8284-0334-1.
- Kline, Morris (November 1983). "Euler and Infinite Series". Mathematics Magazine. 56 (5): 307–314. doi:10.2307/2690371. JSTOR 2690371.
- Knopp, Konrad (1990). Theory and Application of Infinite Series. New York: Dover Publications. ISBN 0486661652. LCCN 89071388.
- Lavine, Shaughan (1994). Understanding the Infinite. Harvard UP. ISBN 978-0-674-92096-5.
- Markusevič, Aleksej Ivanovič (1967). Series: fundamental concepts with historical exposition (English translation of 3rd revised edition (1961) in Russian ed.). Delhi, India: Hindustan Pub. Corp. p. 176. LCCN sa68017528. OCLC 729238507. Author also known as A. I. Markushevich and Alekseï Ivanovitch Markouchevitch. Also published in Boston, Mass by Heath with OCLC 474456247. Additionally, OCLC 208730, OCLC 487226828.
- Saichev, A. I.; Woyczyński, W. A. (1996). Distributions in the Physical and Engineering Sciences, Volume 1. Birkhaüser. ISBN 978-0-8176-3924-2.
- Shawyer, Bruce; Watson, Bruce (1994). Borel's Methods of Summability: Theory and Application. Oxford Mathematical Monographs. The Clarendon Press, Oxford University Press, New York. ISBN 0-19-853585-6. MR 1320266.
- Tucciarone, John (January 1973). "The development of the theory of summable divergent series from 1880 to 1925". Archive for History of Exact Sciences. 10 (1–2): 1–40. doi:10.1007/BF00343405. S2CID 121888821.
- Vretblad, Anders (2003). Fourier Analysis and Its Applications. Springer. ISBN 978-0-387-00836-3.
- Weidlich, John E. (June 1950). Summability methods for divergent series. Stanford M.S. theses. OCLC 38624384.
