= Divergent series =

Infinite series that is not convergent

Les séries divergentes sont en général quelque chose de bien fatal et c’est une honte qu’on ose y fonder aucune démonstration. ("Divergent series are in general something fatal, and it is a disgrace to base any proof on them." Often translated as "Divergent series are an invention of the devil …")

— N. H. Abel, letter to Holmboe, January 1826, reprinted in volume 2 of his collected papers.

In mathematics, a divergent series is an infinite series that is not convergent, meaning that the infinite sequence of the partial sums of the series does not have a finite limit.

If a series converges, the individual terms of the series must approach zero. Thus any series in which the individual terms do not approach zero diverges. However, convergence is a stronger condition: not all series whose terms approach zero converge. A counterexample is the harmonic series

$$1 + \frac{1}{2} + \frac{1}{3} + \frac{1}{4} + \frac{1}{5} + \cdots =\sum_{n=1}^\infty\frac{1}{n}.$$

The divergence of the harmonic series was proven by the medieval mathematician Nicole Oresme.

In specialized mathematical contexts, values can be objectively assigned to certain series whose sequences of partial sums diverge, in order to make meaning of the divergence of the series. A summability method or summation method is a partial function from the set of series to values. For example, Cesàro summation assigns Grandi's divergent series

$$1 - 1 + 1 - 1 + \cdots$$

the value 1/2. Cesàro summation is an averaging method, in that it relies on the arithmetic mean of the sequence of partial sums. Other methods involve analytic continuations of related series. In physics, there are a wide variety of summability methods; these are discussed in greater detail in the article on regularization.

== History ==
... but it is broadly true to say that mathematicians before Cauchy asked not 'How shall we define 1 − 1 + 1...?' but 'What is 1 − 1 + 1...?', and that this habit of mind led them into unnecessary perplexities and controversies which were often really verbal.

— G. H. Hardy, Divergent series, page 6

Before the 19th century, divergent series were widely used by Leonhard Euler and others, but often led to confusing and contradictory results. A major problem was Euler's idea that any divergent series should have a natural sum, without first defining what is meant by the sum of a divergent series. Augustin-Louis Cauchy eventually gave a rigorous definition of the sum of a (convergent) series, and for some time after this, divergent series were mostly excluded from mathematics. They reappeared in 1886 with Henri Poincaré's work on asymptotic series. In 1890, Ernesto Cesàro realized that one could give a rigorous definition of the sum of some divergent series, and defined Cesàro summation. (This was not the first use of Cesàro summation, which was used implicitly by Ferdinand Georg Frobenius in 1880; Cesàro's key contribution was not the discovery of this method, but his idea that one should give an explicit definition of the sum of a divergent series.) In the years after Cesàro's paper, several other mathematicians gave other definitions of the sum of a divergent series, although these are not always compatible: different definitions can give different answers for the sum of the same divergent series; so, when talking about the sum of a divergent series, it is necessary to specify which summation method one is using.

== Examples ==
- 1 − 1 + 1 − 1 + ⋯$\text{ “ = ” }\frac{1}{2}$
- 1 − 2 + 3 − 4 + ⋯$\text{ “ = ” }\frac{1}{4}$
- 1 − 1 + 2 − 6 + 24 − 120 + ⋯$\text{ “ = ” }\!\!\int_0^\infty \frac{e^{-x}}{1+x} \, dx \approx 0.596\,347\ldots$
- 1 − 2 + 4 − 8 + ⋯$\text{ “ = ” }\frac{1}{3}$
- 1 + 2 + 4 + 8 + ⋯$\text{ “ = ” }-1$
- 1 + 1 + 1 + 1 + ⋯$\text{ “ = ” }-\frac{1}{2}$
- 1 + 2 + 3 + 4 + ⋯$\text{ “ = ” }-\frac{1}{12}$
- 1 + 4 + 9 + 16 + ⋯$\text{ “ = ” }0$

== Theorems on methods for summing divergent series ==
A summability method M is regular if it agrees with the actual limit on all convergent series. Such a result is called an Abelian theorem for M, from the prototypical Abel's theorem. More subtle, are partial converse results, called Tauberian theorems, from a prototype proved by Alfred Tauber. Here partial converse means that if M sums the series Σ, and some side-condition holds, then Σ was convergent in the first place; without any side-condition such a result would say that M only summed convergent series (making it useless as a summation method for divergent series).

The function giving the sum of a convergent series is linear, and it follows from the Hahn–Banach theorem that it may be extended to a summation method summing any series with bounded partial sums. This is called the Banach limit. This fact is not very useful in practice, since there are many such extensions, inconsistent with each other, and also since proving such operators exist requires invoking the axiom of choice or its equivalents, such as Zorn's lemma. They are therefore nonconstructive.

The subject of divergent series, as a domain of mathematical analysis, is primarily concerned with explicit and natural techniques such as Abel summation, Cesàro summation and Borel summation, and their relationships. The advent of Wiener's tauberian theorem marked an epoch in the subject, introducing unexpected connections to Banach algebra methods in Fourier analysis.

Summation of divergent series is also related to extrapolation methods and sequence transformations as numerical techniques. Examples of such techniques are Padé approximants, Levin-type sequence transformations, and order-dependent mappings related to renormalization techniques for large-order perturbation theory in quantum mechanics.

== Properties of summation methods ==
Summation methods usually concentrate on the sequence of partial sums of the series. While this sequence does not converge, we may often find that when we take an average of larger and larger numbers of initial terms of the sequence, the average converges, and we can use this average instead of a limit to evaluate the sum of the series. A summation method can be seen as a function from a set of sequences of partial sums to values. If A is any summation method assigning values to a set of sequences, we may mechanically translate this to a series-summation method A^{Σ} that assigns the same values to the corresponding series. There are certain properties it is desirable for these methods to possess if they are to arrive at values corresponding to limits and sums, respectively.

- Regularity. A summation method is regular if, whenever the sequence s converges to x, A(s) = x. Equivalently, the corresponding series-summation method evaluates A^{Σ}(a) = x.
- Linearity. A is linear if it is a linear functional on the sequences where it is defined, so that A(k r + s) = k A(r) + A(s) for sequences r, s and a real or complex scalar k. Since the terms a_{n+1} = s_{n+1} − s_{n} of the series a are linear functionals on the sequence s and vice versa, this is equivalent to A^{Σ} being a linear functional on the terms of the series.
- Stability (also called translativity). If s is a sequence starting from s_{0} and s′ is the sequence obtained by omitting the first value and subtracting it from the rest, so that s′_{n} = s_{n+1} − s_{0}, then A(s) is defined if and only if A(s′) is defined, and A(s) = s_{0} + A(s′). Equivalently, whenever a′_{n} = a_{n+1} for all n, then A^{Σ}(a) = a_{0} + A^{Σ}(a′). Another way of stating this is that the shift rule must be valid for the series that are summable by this method.

The third condition is less important, and some significant methods, such as Borel summation, do not possess it.

One can also give a weaker alternative to the last condition.

- Finite re-indexability. If a and a′ are two series such that there exists a bijection $f: \mathbb{N} \rightarrow \mathbb{N}$ such that a_{i} = a′_{f(i)} for all i, and if there exists some $N \in \mathbb{N}$ such that a_{i} = a′_{i} for all i > N, then A^{Σ}(a) = A^{Σ}(a′). (In other words, a′ is the same series as a, with only finitely many terms re-indexed.) This is a weaker condition than stability, because any summation method that exhibits stability also exhibits finite re-indexability, but the converse is not true.)

A desirable property for two distinct summation methods A and B to share is consistency: A and B are consistent if for every sequence s to which both assign a value, A(s) = B(s). (Using this language, a summation method A is regular iff it is consistent with the standard sum Σ.) If two methods are consistent, and one sums more series than the other, the one summing more series is stronger.

There are powerful numerical summation methods that are neither regular nor linear, for instance nonlinear sequence transformations like Levin-type sequence transformations and Padé approximants, as well as the order-dependent mappings of perturbative series based on renormalization techniques.

Taking regularity, linearity and stability as axioms, it is possible to sum many divergent series by elementary algebraic manipulations. This partly explains why many different summation methods give the same answer for certain series.

For instance, whenever r ≠ 1, the geometric series

$$\begin{align}
G(r,c) & = \sum_{k=0}^\infty cr^k & & \\
& = c + \sum_{k=0}^\infty cr^{k+1} & & \text{ (stability) } \\
& = c + r \sum_{k=0}^\infty cr^k & & \text{ (linearity) } \\
& = c + r \, G(r,c), & & \text{ hence } \\
G(r,c) & = \frac{c}{1-r} ,\text{ unless it is infinite} & & \\
\end{align}$$

can be evaluated regardless of convergence. More rigorously, any summation method that possesses these properties and which assigns a finite value to the geometric series must assign this value. However, when r is a real number larger than 1, the partial sums increase without bound, and averaging methods assign a limit of infinity.

== Classical summation methods ==
The two classical summation methods for series, ordinary convergence and absolute convergence, define the sum as a limit of certain partial sums. These are included only for completeness; strictly speaking they are not true summation methods for divergent series since, by definition, a series is divergent only if these methods do not work. Most but not all summation methods for divergent series extend these methods to a larger class of sequences.

=== Sum of a series ===
Cauchy's classical definition of the sum of a series a_{0} + a_{1} + ... defines the sum to be the limit of the sequence of partial sums a_{0} + ... + a_{n}. This is the default definition of convergence of a series.

=== Absolute convergence ===
Absolute convergence defines the sum of a sequence (or set) of numbers to be the limit of the net of all partial sums a_{k_{1}} + ... + a_{k_{n}}, if it exists. It does not depend on the order of the elements of the sequence, and a classical theorem says that a sequence is absolutely convergent if and only if the sequence of absolute values is convergent in the standard sense.

== Nørlund means ==
Suppose p_{n} is a sequence of positive terms, starting from p_{0}. Suppose also that

$$\frac{p_n}{p_0+p_1 + \cdots + p_n} \rightarrow 0.$$

If now we transform a sequence s by using p to give weighted means, setting

$$t_m = \frac{p_m s_0 + p_{m-1}s_1 + \cdots + p_0 s_m}{p_0+p_1+\cdots+p_m}$$

then the limit of t_{n} as n goes to infinity is an average called the Nørlund mean N_{p}(s).

The Nørlund mean is regular, linear, and stable. Moreover, any two Nørlund means are consistent.

=== Cesàro summation ===
The most significant of the Nørlund means are the Cesàro sums. Here, if we define the sequence p^{k} by

$$p_n^k = {n+k-1 \choose k-1}$$

then the Cesàro sum C_{k} is defined by C_{k}(s) = N_{(p^{k})}(s). Cesàro sums are Nørlund means if k ≥ 0, and hence are regular, linear, stable, and consistent. C_{0} is ordinary summation, and C_{1} is ordinary Cesàro summation. Cesàro sums have the property that if h > k, then C_{h} is stronger than C_{k}.

== Abelian means ==
Suppose λ = {λ_{0}, λ_{1}, λ_{2},...} is a strictly increasing sequence tending towards infinity, and that λ_{0} ≥ 0. Suppose

$$f(x) = \sum_{n=0}^\infty a_n e^{-\lambda_n x}$$

converges for all real numbers x > 0. Then the Abelian mean A_{λ} is defined as

$$A_\lambda(s) = \lim_{x \rightarrow 0^{+}} f(x).$$

More generally, if the series for f only converges for large x but can be analytically continued to all positive real x, then one can still define the sum of the divergent series by the limit above.

A series of this type is known as a generalized Dirichlet series; in applications to physics, this is known as the method of heat-kernel regularization.

Abelian means are regular and linear, but not stable and not always consistent between different choices of λ. However, some special cases are very important summation methods.

=== Abel summation ===
If λ_{n} = n, then we obtain the method of Abel summation. Here

$$f(x) = \sum_{n=0}^\infty a_n e^{-nx} = \sum_{n=0}^\infty a_n z^n,$$

where z = exp(−x). Then the limit of f(x) as x approaches 0 through positive reals is the limit of the power series for f(z) as z approaches 1 from below through positive reals, and the Abel sum A(s) is defined as

$$A(s) = \lim_{z \rightarrow 1^{-}} \sum_{n=0}^\infty a_n z^n.$$

Abel summation is interesting in part because it is consistent with but more powerful than Cesàro summation: A(s) = C_{k}(s) whenever the latter is defined. The Abel sum is therefore regular, linear, stable, and consistent with Cesàro summation.

=== Lindelöf summation ===
If λ_{n} = n log(n), then (indexing from one) we have

$$f(x) = a_1 + a_2 2^{-2x} + a_3 3^{-3x} + \cdots .$$

Then L(s), the Lindelöf sum, is the limit of f(x) as x goes to positive zero. The Lindelöf sum is a powerful method when applied to power series among other applications, summing power series in the Mittag-Leffler star.

If g(z) is analytic in a disk around zero, and hence has a Maclaurin series G(z) with a positive radius of convergence, then L(G(z)) = g(z) in the Mittag-Leffler star. Moreover, convergence to g(z) is uniform on compact subsets of the star.

== Analytic continuation ==
Several summation methods involve taking the value of an analytic continuation of a function.

=== Analytic continuation of power series ===
If Σa_{n}x^{n} converges for small complex x and can be analytically continued along some path from x = 0 to the point x = 1, then the sum of the series can be defined to be the value at x = 1. This value may depend on the choice of path. One of the first examples of potentially different sums for a divergent series, using analytic continuation, was given by Callet, who observed that if $1 \leq m < n$ then

$\frac{1-x^m}{1-x^n} = \frac{1 + x + \dots + x^{m-1}}{1 + x + \dots + x^{n-1}} = 1 - x^m + x^n - x^{n+m} + x^{2n} - \dots$

Evaluating at $x=1$, one gets

$1 - 1 + 1 - 1 + \dots = \frac{m}{n} .$

However, the gaps in the series are key. For $m=1, n=3$ for example, we actually would get

$1-1+0+1-1+0+1-1+\dots = \frac{1}{3}$, so different sums correspond to different placements of the $0$'s.

Another example of analytic continuation is the divergent alternating series $\sum_{k \ge 0} (-1)^{k+1}\frac{1}{2k-1}\binom{2k}{k} =1+2-2+4-10+28-84+264-858+2860-9724+\cdots$ which is a sum over products of $\Gamma$-functions and Pochhammer's symbols. Using the duplication formula of the $\Gamma$-function, it reduces to a generalized hypergeometric series $\ldots = \sum_{k \ge 0} (-4)^k\frac{(-1/2)_k}{k!} ={}_1F_0(-1/2;;-4) = \sqrt{5}.$

=== Euler summation ===
Euler summation is essentially an explicit form of analytic continuation. If a power series converges for small complex z and can be analytically continued to the open disk with diameter from (−1)/(q + 1) to 1 and is continuous at 1, then its value at q is called the Euler or (E,q) sum of the series Σa_{n}. Euler used it before analytic continuation was defined in general, and gave explicit formulas for the power series of the analytic continuation.

The operation of Euler summation can be repeated several times, and this is essentially equivalent to taking an analytic continuation of a power series to the point z = 1.

=== Analytic continuation of Dirichlet series ===
This method defines the sum of a series to be the value of the analytic continuation of the Dirichlet series

$$f(s) = \frac{a_1}{1^s} + \frac{a_2}{2^s} + \frac{a_3}{3^s}+ \cdots$$

at s = 0, if this exists and is unique. This method is sometimes confused with zeta function regularization.

If s = 0 is an isolated singularity, the sum is defined by the constant term of the Laurent series expansion.

=== Zeta function regularization ===
If the series

$$f(s) = \frac{1}{a_1^s} + \frac{1}{a_2^s} + \frac{1}{a_3^s}+ \cdots$$

(for positive values of the a_{n}) converges for large real s and can be analytically continued along the real line to s = −1, then its value at s = −1 is called the zeta regularized sum of the series a_{1} + a_{2} + ... Zeta function regularization is nonlinear. In applications, the numbers a_{i} are sometimes the eigenvalues of a self-adjoint operator A with compact resolvent, and f(s) is then the trace of A^{−s}. For example, if A has eigenvalues 1, 2, 3, ... then f(s) is the Riemann zeta function, ζ(s), whose value at s = −1 is −1/12, assigning a value to the divergent series 1 + 2 + 3 + 4 + ⋯. Other values of s can also be used to assign values for the divergent sums ζ(0) = 1 + 1 + 1 + ... = −1/2, ζ(−2) = 1 + 4 + 9 + ... = 0 and in general

$$\zeta(-s)=\sum_{n=1}^\infty n^s=1^s + 2^s + 3^s + \cdots = -\frac{B_{s+1}}{s+1}\, ,$$

where B_{k} is a Bernoulli number and $B_1 = +\frac{1}{2}$.

== Integral function means ==
If J(x) = Σp_{n}x^{n} is an integral function, then the J sum of the series a_{0} + ... is defined to be

$$\lim_{x\rightarrow\infty}\frac{\sum_np_n(a_0+\cdots+a_n)x^n}{\sum_np_nx^n},$$

if this limit exists.

There is a variation of this method where the series for J has a finite radius of convergence r and diverges at x = r. In this case one defines the sum as above, except taking the limit as x tends to r rather than infinity.

=== Borel summation ===
In the special case when J(x) = e^{x} this gives one (weak) form of Borel summation.

=== Valiron's method ===
Valiron's method is a generalization of Borel summation to certain more general integral functions J. Valiron showed that under certain conditions it is equivalent to defining the sum of a series as

$$\lim_{n\rightarrow +\infty}\sqrt{\frac{H(n)}{2\pi}}\sum_{h\in Z} e^{-\frac12 h^2H(n)}(a_0+\cdots+a_h)$$

where H is the second derivative of G and c(n) = e^{−G(n)}, and a_{0} + ... + a_{h} is to be interpreted as 0 when h < 0.

== Moment methods ==
Suppose that dμ is a measure on the real line such that all the moments

$$\mu_n=\int x^n \, d\mu$$

are finite. If a_{0} + a_{1} + ... is a series such that

$$a(x)=\frac{a_0x^0}{\mu_0}+\frac{a_1x^1}{\mu_1}+\cdots$$

converges for all x in the support of μ, then the (dμ) sum of the series is defined to be the value of the integral

$$\int a(x) \, d\mu$$

if it is defined. (If the numbers μ_{n} increase too rapidly then they do not uniquely determine the measure μ.)

=== Borel summation ===
For example, if dμ = e^{−x} dx for positive x and 0 for negative x then μ_{n} = n!, and this gives one version of Borel summation, where the value of a sum is given by

$$\int_0^\infty e^{-t}\sum\frac{a_nt^n}{n!} \, dt.$$

There is a generalization of this depending on a variable α, called the (B′,α) sum, where the sum of a series a_{0} + ... is defined to be

$$\int_0^\infty e^{-t}\sum\frac{a_nt^{n\alpha}}{\Gamma(n\alpha+1)} \, dt$$

if this integral exists. A further generalization is to replace the sum under the integral by its analytic continuation from small t.

== Miscellaneous methods ==
=== BGN hyperreal summation ===
This summation method works by using an extension to the real numbers known as the hyperreal numbers. Since the hyperreal numbers include distinct infinite values, these numbers can be used to represent the values of divergent series. The key method is to designate a particular infinite value that is being summed, usually $\omega$, which is used as a unit of infinity. Instead of summing to an arbitrary infinity (as is typically done with $\infty$), the BGN method sums to the specific hyperreal infinite value labeled $\omega$. Therefore, the summations are of the form

$$\sum_{x=1}^\omega f(x)$$

This allows the usage of standard formulas for finite series such as arithmetic progressions in an infinite context. For instance, using this method, the sum of the progression $1 + 2 + 3 + \ldots$ is $\frac{\omega^2}{2} + \frac{\omega}{2}$, or, using just the most significant infinite hyperreal part, $\frac{\omega^2}{2}$.

=== Hausdorff transformations ===
Hardy (1949, chapter 11).

=== Hutton's method ===
In 1812 Hutton introduced a method of summing divergent series by starting with the sequence of partial sums, and repeatedly applying the operation of replacing a sequence s_{0}, s_{1}, ... by the sequence of averages (s_{0} + s_{1})/2, (s_{1} + s_{2})/2, ..., and then taking the limit.

=== Ingham summability ===
The series a_{1} + ... is called Ingham summable to s if

$$\lim_{x\rightarrow \infty} \sum_{1\le n\le x} a_n\frac{n}{x}\left[\frac{x}{n}\right] = s.$$

Albert Ingham showed that if δ is any positive number then (C,−δ) (Cesàro) summability implies Ingham summability, and Ingham summability implies (C,δ) summability.

=== Lambert summability ===
The series a_{1} + ... is called Lambert summable to s if

$$\lim_{y\rightarrow 0^+} \sum_{n\ge 1} a_n\frac{nye^{-ny}}{1-e^{-ny}} = s.$$

If a series is (C,k) (Cesàro) summable for any k then it is Lambert summable to the same value, and if a series is Lambert summable then it is Abel summable to the same value.

=== Le Roy summation ===
The series a_{0} + ... is called Le Roy summable to s if

$$\lim_{\zeta\rightarrow 1^-} \sum_{n} \frac{\Gamma(1+\zeta n)}{\Gamma(1+ n)} a_n = s.$$

=== Mittag-Leffler summation ===
The series a_{0} + ... is called Mittag-Leffler (M) summable to s if

$$\lim_{\delta\rightarrow 0} \sum_{n} \frac{a_n}{\Gamma(1+\delta n)} = s.$$

=== Ramanujan summation ===
Ramanujan summation is a method of assigning a value to divergent series used by Ramanujan and based on the Euler–Maclaurin summation formula. The Ramanujan sum of a series f(0) + f(1) + ... depends not only on the values of f at integers, but also on values of the function f at non-integral points, so it is not really a summation method in the sense of this article.

=== Riemann summability ===
The series a_{1} + ... is called (R,k) (or Riemann) summable to s if

$$\lim_{h\rightarrow 0} \sum_{n} a_n\left(\frac{\sin nh}{nh}\right)^k = s.$$

The series a_{1} + ... is called R_{2} summable to s if

$$\lim_{h\rightarrow 0} \frac{2}{\pi}\sum_n \frac{\sin^2 nh}{n^2h}(a_1+\cdots + a_n) = s.$$

=== Riesz means ===
If λ_{n} form an increasing sequence of real numbers and

$$A_\lambda(x)=a_0+\cdots+a_n \text{ for } \lambda_n<x\le \lambda_{n+1}$$

then the Riesz (R,λ,κ) sum of the series a_{0} + ... is defined to be

$$\lim_{\omega\rightarrow\infty} \frac{\kappa}{\omega^\kappa} \int_0^\omega A_\lambda(x)(\omega-x)^{\kappa-1} \, dx.$$

=== Vallée-Poussin summability ===
The series a_{1} + ... is called VP (or Vallée-Poussin) summable to s if

$$\lim_{m\rightarrow \infty} \sum_{k=0}^{m} a_k\frac{[\Gamma(m+1)]^2}{\Gamma(m+1-k)\,\Gamma(m+1+k)} = \lim_{m\rightarrow \infty} \left[a_0+a_1\frac{m}{m+1}+a_2\frac{m(m-1)}{(m+1)(m+2)}+\cdots\right] = s,$$

where $\Gamma(x)$ is the gamma function.

=== Zeldovich summability ===
The series is Zeldovich summable if

$$\lim_{\alpha\to 0^+}\sum_n c_n e^{-\alpha n^2} = s.$$

== See also ==
- Silverman–Toeplitz theorem
- Abel–Dini–Pringsheim theorem
