= Zeta function regularization =

Summability method in physics

In mathematics and theoretical physics, zeta function regularization is a type of regularization or summability method that assigns finite values to divergent sums or products, and in particular can be used to define determinants and traces of some self-adjoint operators. The technique is now commonly applied to problems in physics, but has its origins in attempts to give precise meanings to ill-conditioned sums appearing in number theory.

== Definition ==
There are several different summation methods called zeta function regularization for defining the sum of a possibly divergent series a_{1} + a_{2} + ....

One method is to define its zeta regularized sum to be ζ_{A}(−1) if this is defined, where the zeta function is defined for large Re(s) by

$$\zeta_A(s) = \frac{1}{a_1^s}+\frac{1}{a_2^s} +\cdots$$

if this sum converges, and by analytic continuation elsewhere.

In the case when a_{n} = n, the zeta function is the ordinary Riemann zeta function. This method was used by Srinivasa Ramanujan to "sum" the series 1 + 2 + 3 + 4 + ⋯ to ζ(−1) = −1/12.

Stephen Hawking (1977) showed that in flat space, in which the eigenvalues of Laplacians are known, the zeta function corresponding to the partition function can be computed explicitly. Consider a scalar field φ contained in a large box of volume V in flat spacetime at the temperature T = β^{−1}. The partition function is defined by a path integral over all fields φ on the Euclidean space obtained by putting τ = it which are zero on the walls of the box and which are periodic in τ with period β. In this situation from the partition function he computes energy, entropy and pressure of the radiation of the field φ. In case of flat spaces the eigenvalues appearing in the physical quantities are generally known, while in case of curved space they are not known: in this case asymptotic methods are needed.

Another method defines the possibly divergent infinite product a_{1}a_{2}.... to be exp(−ζ′_{A}(0)). D. B. Ray and I. M. Singer (1971) used this to define the determinant of a positive self-adjoint operator A (the Laplacian of a Riemannian manifold in their application) with eigenvalues a_{1}, a_{2}, ...., and in this case the zeta function is formally the trace of A^{−s}. S. Minakshisundaram and Å. Pleijel (1949) showed that if A is the Laplacian of a compact Riemannian manifold then the Minakshisundaram–Pleijel zeta function converges and has an analytic continuation as a meromorphic function to all complex numbers, and R. T. Seeley (1967) extended this to elliptic pseudo-differential operators A on compact Riemannian manifolds. So for such operators one can define the determinant using zeta function regularization. See "analytic torsion."

Hawking (1977) suggested using this idea to evaluate path integrals in curved spacetimes. He studied zeta function regularization in order to calculate the partition functions for thermal gravitons and matter's quanta in curved background such as on the horizon of black holes and on de Sitter background using the relation by the inverse Mellin transformation to the trace of the kernel of heat equations.

== Example ==
The first example in which zeta function regularization is available appears in the Casimir effect, which is in a flat space with the bulk contributions of the quantum field in three space dimensions. In this case we must calculate the value of Riemann zeta function at –3, which diverges explicitly. However, it can be analytically continued to s = –3 where hopefully there is no pole, thus giving a finite value to the expression. A detailed example of this regularization at work is given in the article on the detail example of the Casimir effect, where the resulting sum is very explicitly the Riemann zeta-function (and where the seemingly legerdemain analytic continuation removes an additive infinity, leaving a physically significant finite number).

An example of zeta-function regularization is the calculation of the vacuum expectation value of the energy of a particle field in quantum field theory. More generally, the zeta-function approach can be used to regularize the whole energy–momentum tensor both in flat and in curved spacetime.

The unregulated value of the energy is given by a summation over the zero-point energy of all of the excitation modes of the vacuum:

$$\langle 0|T_{00} |0\rangle = \sum_n \frac{\hbar |\omega_n|}{2}$$

Here, $T_{00}$ is the zeroth component of the energy–momentum tensor and the sum (which may be an integral) is understood to extend over all (positive and negative) energy modes $\omega_n$; the absolute value reminding us that the energy is taken to be positive. This sum, as written, is usually infinite ($\omega_n$ is typically linear in n). The sum may be regularized by writing it as

$$\langle 0|T_{00}(s) |0\rangle =
\sum_n \frac{\hbar |\omega_n|}{2} |\omega_n|^{-s}$$

where s is some parameter, taken to be a complex number. For large, real s greater than 4 (for three-dimensional space), the sum is manifestly finite, and thus may often be evaluated theoretically.

The zeta-regularization is useful as it can often be used in a way such that the various symmetries of the physical system are preserved. Zeta-function regularization is used in conformal field theory, renormalization and in fixing the critical spacetime dimension of string theory. It can be also employed in various branches of condensed matter physics, including quantum magnetism theory.

== Relation to other regularizations ==
Zeta function regularization is equivalent to dimensional regularization. However, the main advantage of the zeta regularization is that it can be used whenever the dimensional regularization fails, for example if there are matrices or tensors inside the calculations $\epsilon _{i,j,k}$

== Relation to Dirichlet series ==
Zeta-function regularization gives an analytic structure to any sums over an arithmetic function f(n). Such sums are known as Dirichlet series. The regularized form

$$\tilde{f}(s) = \sum_{n=1}^\infty f(n)n^{-s}$$

converts divergences of the sum into simple poles on the complex s-plane. In numerical calculations, the zeta-function regularization is inappropriate, as it is extremely slow to converge. For numerical purposes, a more rapidly converging sum is the exponential regularization, given by

$$F(t)=\sum_{n=1}^\infty f(n) e^{-tn}.$$

This is sometimes called the Z-transform of f, where z = exp(−t). The analytic structure of the exponential and zeta-regularizations are related. By expanding the exponential sum as a Laurent series

$$F(t)=\frac{a_N}{t^N} + \frac{a_{N-1}}{t^{N-1}} + \cdots$$

one finds that the zeta-series has the structure

$$\tilde{f}(s) = \frac{a_N}{s-N} + \cdots.$$

The structure of the exponential and zeta-regulators are related by means of the Mellin transform. The one may be converted to the other by making use of the integral representation of the Gamma function:

$$\Gamma(s)=\int_0^\infty t^{s-1} e^{-t} \, dt$$

which leads to the identity

$$\Gamma(s) \tilde{f}(s) = \int_0^\infty t^{s-1} F(t) \, dt$$

relating the exponential and zeta-regulators, and converting poles in the s-plane to divergent terms in the Laurent series.

== Heat kernel regularization ==
The sum

$$f(s)=\sum_n a_n e^{-s|\omega_n|}$$

is sometimes called a heat kernel or a heat-kernel regularized sum; this name stems from the idea that the $\omega_n$ can sometimes be understood as eigenvalues of the heat kernel. In mathematics, such a sum is known as a generalized Dirichlet series; its use for averaging is known as an Abelian mean. It is closely related to the Laplace–Stieltjes transform, in that

$$f(s)=\int_0^\infty e^{-st} \, d\alpha(t)$$

where $\alpha(t)$ is a step function, with steps of $a_n$ at $t=|\omega_n|$. A number of theorems for the convergence of such a series exist. For example, by the Hardy-Littlewood Tauberian theorem, if

$$L=\limsup_{n\to\infty} \frac{\log\vert\sum_{k=1}^n a_k\vert}{|\omega_n|}$$

then the series for $f(s)$ converges in the half-plane $\Re(s)>L$ and is uniformly convergent on every compact subset of the half-plane $\Re(s)>L$. In almost all applications to physics, one has $L=0$

== History ==
Much of the early work establishing the convergence and equivalence of series regularized with the heat kernel and zeta function regularization methods was done by G. H. Hardy and J. E. Littlewood in 1916 and is based on the application of the Cahen–Mellin integral. The effort was made in order to obtain values for various ill-defined, conditionally convergent sums appearing in number theory.

In terms of application as the regulator in physical problems, before Hawking (1977), J. Stuart Dowker and Raymond Critchley in 1976 proposed a zeta-function regularization method for quantum physical problems. Emilio Elizalde and others have also proposed a method based on the zeta regularization for the integrals $\int_{a}^{\infty}x^{m-s}dx$, here $x^{-s}$ is a regulator and the divergent integral depends on the numbers $\zeta (s-m)$ in the limit $s \to 0$ see renormalization. Also unlike other regularizations such as dimensional regularization and analytic regularization, zeta regularization has no counterterms and gives only finite results.

== See also ==
- Generating function – Formal power series
- Perron's formula – Formula for the sum of an arithmetic function
- Renormalization – Method in physics used to deal with infinities
- 1 + 1 + 1 + 1 + ⋯ – Divergent series
- 1 + 2 + 3 + 4 + ⋯ – Divergent series
- Analytic torsion – Topological invariant of manifolds that can distinguish homotopy-equivalent manifolds
- Ramanujan summation – Mathematical techniques for summing divergent infinite series
- Minakshisundaram–Pleijel zeta function
- Zeta function (operator)
