= 1 + 2 + 4 + 8 + ⋯ =

Infinite series that diverges

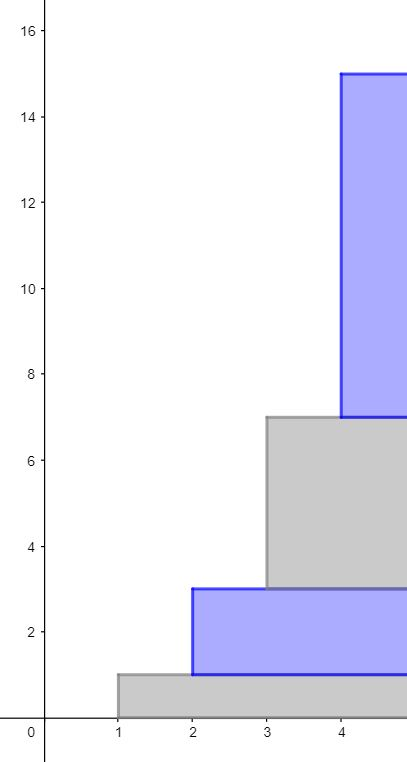
The first four partial sums of 1 + 2 + 4 + 8 + ⋯.

In mathematics, 1 + 2 + 4 + 8 + ⋯ is the infinite series whose terms are the successive powers of two. As a geometric series, it is characterized by its first term, 1, and its common ratio, 2. As a series of real numbers it diverges to infinity, so in the usual sense it has no sum. However, it can be manipulated to yield a number of mathematically interesting results. For example, many summation methods are used in mathematics to assign numerical values even to divergent series. In particular, the Ramanujan summation of this series is −1, which is the limit of the series using the 2-adic metric.

== Summation ==
The partial sum of the first $n$ terms of $1 + 2 + 4 + 8 + \cdots$ is
$$\sum_{k=0}^{n - 1} 2^k = 2^0+2^1 + \cdots + 2^{n - 1} = 2^n - 1.$$
Since the sequence $1, 3, 7, 15, \ldots$ of these partial sums diverges to infinity, so does the series. Therefore, any totally regular summation method gives a sum of infinity, including the Cesàro sum and Abel sum. On the other hand, there is at least one generally useful method that sums $1 + 2 + 4 + 8 + \cdots$ to the finite value of −1. The associated power series
$$f(x) = 1 + 2x + 4x^2 + 8x^3+ \cdots + 2^n{}x^n + \cdots = \frac{1}{1-2x}$$
has a radius of convergence around 0 of only $\frac{1}{2}$ so it does not converge at $x = 1.$ Nonetheless, the so-defined function $f$ has a unique analytic continuation to the complex plane with the point $x = \frac{1}{2}$ deleted, and it is given by the same rule $f(x) = \frac{1}{1 - 2 x}.$ Since $f(1) = -1,$ the original series $1 + 2 + 4 + 8 + \cdots$ is said to be summable (E) to −1, and −1 is the (E) sum of the series. (The notation is due to G. H. Hardy in reference to Leonhard Euler's approach to divergent series.)

An almost identical approach (the one taken by Euler himself) is to consider the power series whose coefficients are all 1, that is,
$$1 + y + y^2 + y^3 + \cdots = \frac{1}{1-y}$$
and plugging in $y = 2.$ These two series are related by the substitution $y = 2 x.$

The fact that (E) summation assigns a finite value to $1 + 2 + 4 + 8 + \cdots$ shows that the general method is not totally regular. On the other hand, it possesses some other desirable qualities for a summation method, including stability and linearity. These latter two axioms actually force the sum to be −1, since they make the following manipulation valid:

$$\begin{align}
s = {} & 1+2+4+8+16+\cdots \\
= {} & 1+2(1+2+4+8+\cdots) \\
= {} & 1+2s
\end{align}$$

In a useful sense, $s = \infty$ is a root of the equation $s = 1 + 2 s.$ (For example, $\infty$ is one of the two fixed points of the Möbius transformation $z \mapsto 1 + 2 z$ on the Riemann sphere). If some summation method is known to return an ordinary number for $s$; that is, not $\infty,$ then it is easily determined. In this case $s$ may be subtracted from both sides of the equation, yielding $0 = 1 + s,$ so $s = -1.$

The above manipulation might be called on to produce −1 outside the context of a sufficiently powerful summation procedure. For the most well-known and straightforward sum concepts, including the fundamental convergent one, it is absurd that a series of positive terms could have a negative value. A similar phenomenon occurs with the divergent geometric series $1 - 1 + 1 - 1 + \cdots$ (Grandi's series), where a series of integers appears to have the non-integer sum $\frac{1}{2}.$ These examples illustrate the potential danger in applying similar arguments to the series implied by such recurring decimals as $0.111\ldots$ and most notably $0.999\ldots$. The arguments are ultimately justified for these convergent series, implying that $0.111\ldots = \frac{1}{9}$ and $0.999\ldots = 1,$ but the underlying proofs demand careful thinking about the interpretation of endless sums.

It is also possible to view this series as convergent in a number system different from the real numbers, namely, the 2-adic numbers. As a series of 2-adic numbers this series converges to the same sum, −1, as was derived above by analytic continuation.

== See also ==
- 1 − 1 + 2 − 6 + 24 − 120 + ⋯
- 1 − 1 + 1 − 1 + ⋯ (Grandi's series)
- 1 + 1 + 1 + 1 + ⋯
- 1 − 2 + 3 − 4 + ⋯
- 1 + 2 + 3 + 4 + ⋯
- 1 − 2 + 4 − 8 + ⋯
- Two's complement, a data convention for representing negative numbers where −1 is represented as if it were 1 + 2 + 4 + ⋯ + 2^{n−1}.
