= Geometric series =

Sum of an (infinite) geometric progression

In mathematics, a geometric series is a series summing the terms of an infinite geometric sequence, in which the ratio of consecutive terms is constant. For example, the series $\tfrac12 + \tfrac14 + \tfrac18 + \cdots$ is a geometric series with common ratio $\tfrac12$, which converges to the sum of $1$. Each term in a geometric series is the geometric mean of the term before it and the term after it, in the same way that each term of an arithmetic series is the arithmetic mean of its neighbors.

While Greek mathematician Zeno's paradoxes about time and motion (5th century BCE) have been interpreted as involving geometric series, such series were formally studied and applied a century or two later by Greek mathematicians, for example used by Archimedes to calculate the area inside a parabola (3rd century BCE). Today, geometric series are used in mathematical finance, calculating areas of fractals, and various computer science topics.

Though geometric series most commonly involve real or complex numbers, there are also important results and applications for matrix-valued geometric series, function-valued geometric series, $p$-adic number geometric series, and most generally geometric series of elements of abstract algebraic fields, rings, and semirings.

== Definition: finite geometric series ==
A geometric series is a series derived from a special type of sequence called a geometric progression. A geometric progression is a sequence obtained from an initial term, producing the next term by multiplying it by a constant from the previous term, and continuing the process with the same constant. Such a constant is called a common ratio. (Note: For example, a sequence $2, 6, 18, 54, \dots$ is a geometric progression with a common ratio of $3$.) Let $a$ be the initial term and $r$ be the common ratio of a geometric progression. For a finite number of terms, the geometric sequence consists of the elements up to $n$-th term, which is written as $a, ar, ar^2, ar^3, \ldots, ar^n$. Summing all terms above produces a finite geometric series, expressed as
$$a + ar + ar^2 + ar^3 + \cdots + ar^n = \sum_{k=0}^n ar^k.$$

When $r > 1$, it is often called a growth rate or rate of expansion. When $0 < r < 1$ it is often called a decay rate or shrink rate, where the idea that it is a "rate" comes from interpreting $k$ as a sort of discrete time variable. When an application area has specialized vocabulary for specific types of growth, expansion, shrinkage, and decay, that vocabulary will also often be used to name $r$ parameters of geometric series. In economics, for instance, rates of increase and decrease of price levels are called inflation rates and deflation rates, while rates of increase in values of investments include rates of return and interest rates.

For $r \ne 1$, the sum of a finite geometric series $S_n$ starting from 0-th term up to $n$-th term is formulated as:
$$S_n = \frac{a(1-r^{n+1})}{1-r}.$$

== Infinite geometric series and convergence ==
The geometric series $$\frac{1}{4} + \frac{1}{16} + \frac{1}{64} + \frac{1}{256} + \cdots$$ is shown as areas of purple squares. Each of the purple squares has $\frac{1}{4}$ of the area of the next larger square $\frac{1}{2} \times \frac{1}{2} = \frac{1}{4}$, $\frac{1}{4} \times \frac{1}{4} = \frac{1}{16}$, and so forth. Thus, the sum of the purple squares' area is one-third of the area of the large square. This series is an example of a convergent geometric series.

When there are infinitely many terms in a geometric progression, the geometric series is:
$$a + ar + ar^2 + ar^3 + \cdots = \sum_{k=0}^\infty ar^k.$$
The result of an infinite series can be either convergent or divergent. Convergence means there is a value after summing infinitely many terms, whereas divergence means no value after summing. The convergence of a geometric series can be described depending on the value of a common ratio. For instance, Grandi's series is a divergent geometric series that can be expressed as $1 - 1 + 1 - 1 + \cdots$, where the initial term is $1$ and the common ratio is $-1$; this is because it has three different values. Decimal numbers that have repeated patterns that continue forever can be interpreted as geometric series and thereby converted to expressions of the ratio of two integers. For example, the repeated decimal fraction $0.7777\ldots$ can be written as the geometric series
$$0.7777\ldots = \frac{7}{10} + \frac{7}{10} \left(\frac{1}{10}\right) + \frac{7}{10} \left(\frac{1}{10^2}\right) + \frac{7}{10} \left(\frac{1}{10^3}\right) + \cdots,$$
where the initial term is $a = \tfrac{7}{10}$ and the common ratio is $r = \tfrac{1}{10}$.

To determine its convergence, one may look up the magnitude of the common ratio $r$ alone:

- If $\vert r \vert < 1$, the terms of the series approach zero (becoming smaller and smaller in magnitude) and the sequence of partial sums $S_n$ converge to a limit value of $\frac{a}{1-r}$.
- If $\vert r \vert > 1$, the terms of the series become larger and larger in magnitude and the partial sums of the terms also get larger and larger in magnitude, so the series diverges.
- If $\vert r \vert = 1$, the terms of the series become no larger or smaller in magnitude and the sequence of partial sums of the series does not converge. When $r=1$, all the terms of the series are the same and the $|S_n|$ grow to infinity. When $r = -1$, the terms take two values $a$ and $-a$ alternately, and therefore the sequence of partial sums of the terms oscillates between the two values $a$ and 0. One example can be found in Grandi's series. When the common ratio is the imaginary unit $r=i$ and $a = 1$, the partial sums circulate periodically among the complex numbers $1$, $1+i$, $i$, $0$, $1$, $1+i$, $i$, $0$, ..., never converging to a limit. When the common ratio is a root of unity $r= e^{2\pi i p / q}$ for a rational number $p/q$ in lowest terms and with any $a \neq 0$, the partial sums of the series will circulate indefinitely with a period of $q$, never converging to a limit.

The rate of convergence shows how the sequence quickly approaches its limit. In the case of the geometric series—the relevant sequence is $S_n$ and its limit is $S$—the rate and order are found via
$$\lim _{n \rightarrow \infty} \frac{\left|S_{n+1} - S\right|}{\left|S_{n}-S\right|^{q}},$$
where $q$ represents the order of convergence. Using $|S_n - S| = \left| \frac{ar^{n+1}}{1-r} \right|$ and choosing the order of convergence $q = 1$ gives:
$$\lim _{n \rightarrow \infty} \frac{\left| \frac{ar^{n+2}}{1-r} \right|}{\left| \frac{ar^{n+1}}{1-r} \right|^{1}} = |r|.$$
When the series converges, the rate of convergence gets slower as $|r|$ approaches $1$. The pattern of convergence also depends on the sign or complex argument of the common ratio. If $r > 0$ and $|r| < 1$ then terms all share the same sign and the partial sums of the terms approach their eventual limit monotonically. If $r < 0$ and $|r| < 1$, adjacent terms in the geometric series alternate between positive and negative, and the partial sums $S_n$ of the terms oscillate above and below their eventual limit $S$. For complex $r$ and $|r| < 1,$ the $S_n$ converge in a spiraling pattern.

=== Proof of convergence ===
The convergence is proved as follows. The partial sum of the first $n + 1$ terms of a geometric series, up to and including the $r^{n}$ term,
$$S_n = ar^0 + ar^1 + \cdots + ar^{n} = \sum_{k=0}^{n} ar^k,$$
is given by the closed form
$$S_n = \begin{cases}
a(n + 1)  & r = 1\\
a\left(\frac{1-r^{n+1}}{1-r}\right) & \text{otherwise}
\end{cases}$$
where $r$ is the common ratio. The case $r = 1$ is merely a simple addition, a case of an arithmetic series. The formula for the partial sums $S_n$ with $r \neq 1$ can be derived as follows:
$$\begin{align}
S_n &= ar^0 + ar^1 + \cdots + ar^{n},\\
rS_n &= ar^1 + ar^2 + \cdots + ar^{n+1},\\
S_n - rS_n &= ar^0 - ar^{n+1},\\
S_n\left(1-r\right) &= a\left(1-r^{n+1}\right),\\
S_n &= a\left(\frac{1-r^{n+1}}{1-r}\right),
\end{align}$$
for $r \neq 1$. As $r$ approaches 1, polynomial division or L'Hôpital's rule recovers the case $S_n = a(n + 1)$.

Proof without words of the formula for the sum of a geometric series if $|r| < 1$ and $n \to \infty$, the $r^n$ term vanishes, leaving $\lim_{n \to \infty} S_n = \frac{a}{1-r}$. This figure uses a slightly different convention for $S_n$ than the main text, shifted by one term.

As $n$ approaches infinity, the absolute value of r must be less than one for this sequence of partial sums to converge to a limit. When it does, the series converges absolutely. The infinite series then becomes
$$\begin{align}
S &= a+ar+ar^2+ar^3+ar^4+\cdots\\
&= \lim_{n \rightarrow \infty} S_n\\
&= \lim_{n \rightarrow \infty} \frac{a(1-r^{n+1})}{1-r} \\
&= \frac{a}{1-r} - \frac{a}{1-r} \lim_{n \rightarrow \infty} r^{n+1} \\
&= \frac{a}{1-r},
\end{align}$$
for $|r| < 1$.

This convergence result is widely applied to prove the convergence of other series as well, whenever those series's terms can be bounded from above by a suitable geometric series; that proof strategy is the basis for the ratio test and root test for the convergence of infinite series.

== Connection to the power series ==
Like the geometric series, a power series has one parameter for a common variable raised to successive powers corresponding to the geometric series's $r$, but it has additional parameters $a_0, a_1, a_2, \ldots,$ one for each term in the series, for the distinct coefficients of each $x^0, x^1, x^2, \ldots$, rather than just a single additional parameter $a$ for all terms, the common coefficient of $r^k$ in each term of a geometric series. The geometric series can therefore be considered a class of power series in which the sequence of coefficients satisfies $a_k = a$ for all $k$ and $x = r$.

This special class of power series plays an important role in mathematics, for instance for the study of ordinary generating functions in combinatorics and the summation of divergent series in analysis. Many other power series can be written as transformations and combinations of geometric series, making the geometric series formula a convenient tool for calculating formulas for those power series as well.

As a power series, the geometric series has a radius of convergence of 1. This could be seen as a consequence of the Cauchy–Hadamard theorem and the fact that
$$\lim_{n \rightarrow \infty}\sqrt[n]{a} = 1$$
for any $a$ or as a consequence of the ratio test for the convergence of infinite series, with
$$\lim_{n \rightarrow \infty} \frac{|a r^{n+1}| }{ |a r^{n}|} = |r|$$
implying convergence only for $|r| < 1.$ However, both the ratio test and the Cauchy–Hadamard theorem are proven using the geometric series formula as a logically prior result, so such reasoning would be subtly circular.

== Applications ==
As mentioned above, the geometric series can be applied in the field of economics. This leads to the common ratio of a geometric series that may refer to the rates of increase and decrease of price levels are called inflation rates and deflation rates; in contrast, the rates of increase in values of investments include rates of return and interest rates. More specifically, in mathematical finance and actuarial mathematics, geometric series can also be applied in time value of money; that is, to represent the present values of perpetual annuities, sums of money to be paid each year indefinitely into the future. This sort of calculation is used to compute the annual percentage rate of a loan, such as a mortgage loan. It can also be used to estimate the present value of expected stock dividends, or the terminal value of a financial asset assuming a stable growth rate. However, the assumption that interest rates are constant is generally incorrect, and payments are unlikely to continue forever since the issuer of the perpetual annuity may lose its ability or end its commitment to make continued payments, so estimates like these are only heuristic guidelines for decision making rather than scientific predictions of actual current values.

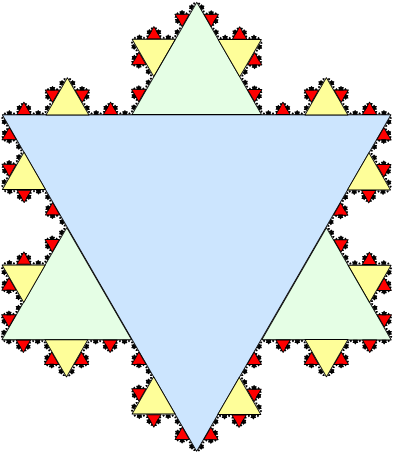
The interior of the Koch snowflake is a union of infinitely many triangles

In addition to finding the area enclosed by a parabola and a line in Archimedes' The Quadrature of the Parabola, the geometric series may also be applied in finding the Koch snowflake's area described as the union of infinitely many equilateral triangles (see figure). Each side of the green triangle is exactly $\frac{1}{3}$ the size of a side of the large blue triangle and therefore has exactly $\frac{1}{9}$ the area. Similarly, each yellow triangle has $\frac{1}{9}$ the area of a green triangle, and so forth. All of these triangles can be represented in terms of geometric series: the blue triangle's area is the first term, the three green triangles' area is the second term, the twelve yellow triangles' area is the third term, and so forth. Excluding the initial 1, this series has a common ratio $r = \frac{4}{9}$, and by taking the blue triangle as a unit of area, the total area of the snowflake is:
$$1 + 3\left(\frac{1}{9}\right) + 12\left(\frac{1}{9}\right)^2 + 48\left(\frac{1}{9}\right)^3 + \cdots = 1 + \frac{\frac{1}{3}}{1 - \frac{4}{9}} = \frac{8}{5}.$$

== Background ==
2,500 years ago, Greek mathematicians believed that an infinitely long list of positive numbers must sum to infinity. Therefore, Zeno of Elea created a paradox, demonstrating as follows: in order to walk from one place to another, one must first walk half the distance there, and then half of the remaining distance, and half of that remaining distance, and so on, covering infinitely many intervals before arriving. In doing so, he partitioned a fixed distance into an infinitely long list of halved remaining distances, each with a length greater than zero. Zeno's paradox revealed to the Greeks that their assumption about an infinitely long list of positive numbers needing to add up to infinity was incorrect.

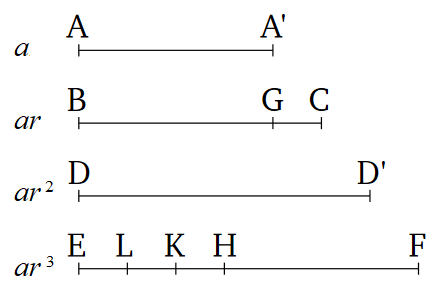
Illustration of Euclid's Elements, Book IX, Proposition 35.

Archimedes' dissection of a parabolic segment into infinitely many triangles

Euclid's Elements has the distinction of being the world's oldest continuously used mathematical textbook, and it includes a demonstration of the sum of finite geometric series in Book IX, Proposition 35, illustrated in an adjacent figure. The proposition quotes as follows:

"If there is any multitude whatsoever of continually proportional numbers, and equal to the first is subtracted from the second and the last, then as the excess of the second to the first, so the excess of the last will be to all those before it."

Archimedes in his The Quadrature of the Parabola used the sum of a geometric series to compute the area enclosed by a parabola and a straight line. Archimedes' theorem states that the total area under the parabola is $\frac{4}{3}$ of the area of the blue triangle. His method was to dissect the area into infinitely many triangles, as shown in the adjacent figure. He determined that each green triangle has $\frac{1}{8}$ the area of the blue triangle, each yellow triangle has $\frac{1}{8}$ the area of a green triangle, and so forth. Assuming that the blue triangle has area 1, then, the total area is the sum of the infinite series
$$1 + 2\left(\frac{1}{8}\right) + 4\left(\frac{1}{8}\right)^2 + 8\left(\frac{1}{8}\right)^3 + \cdots.$$
Here, the first term represents the area of the blue triangle, the second term is the area of the two green triangles, the third term is the area of the four yellow triangles, and so on. Simplifying the fractions gives
$$1 + \frac{1}{4} + \frac{1}{16} + \frac{1}{64} + \cdots,$$
a geometric series with common ratio $r = \tfrac14$ and its sum is:
$$\frac{1}{1 -r}\ = \frac{1}{1 -\frac{1}{4}} = \frac{4}{3}.$$

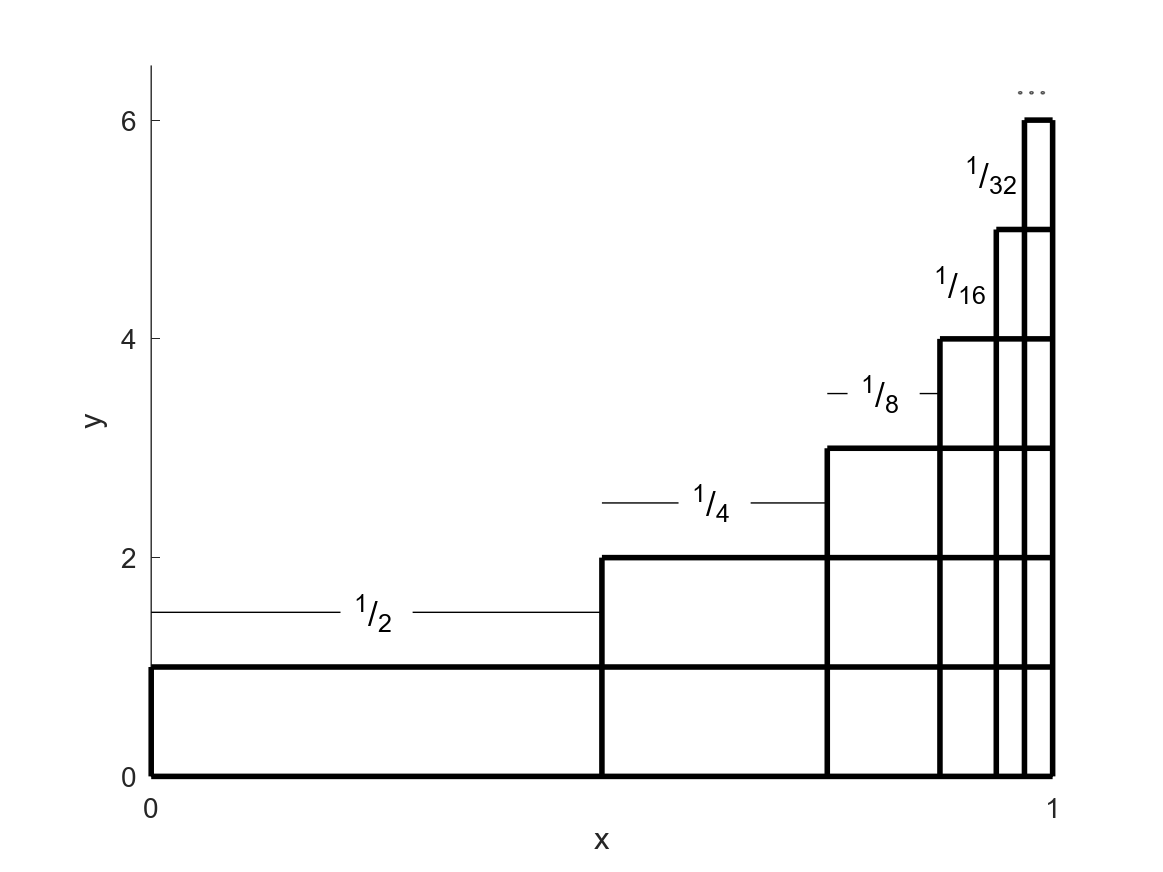
Nicole Oresme's two-dimensional geometric series diagram used to determine that the infinite series $\tfrac12 + \tfrac24 + \tfrac38 + \tfrac4{16} + \tfrac5{32} + \tfrac6{64} + \tfrac7{128} + \cdots$ converges to 2.: The first dimension is horizontal, in the bottom row, representing the geometric series with initial value $a=\tfrac12$ and common ratio $r=\tfrac12$: $$S = \frac{1}{2}+\frac{1}{4}+\frac{1}{8}+\cdots = \frac{\frac{1}{2}}{1 - \frac{1}{2}} = 1.$$; The second dimension is vertical, where the bottom row is a new initial term $a = S$. Each subsequent row above it shrinks according to the same common ratio $r=\tfrac12$, making another geometric series with sum $T$: $$\begin{align} T &= S \left(1 + \frac{1}{2} + \frac{1}{4} + \frac{1}{8} + \cdots\right)\\ &= \frac{S}{1-r} = \frac{1}{1-\frac{1}{2}} = 2. \end{align}$$; This approach generalizes usefully to higher dimensions, and that generalization is described above in § Connection to the power series.

In addition to his elegantly simple proof of the divergence of the harmonic series, Nicole Oresme proved that the arithmetico-geometric series known as Gabriel's Staircase,
$$\frac{1}{2}+\frac{2}{4}+\frac{3}{8}+\frac{4}{16}+\frac{5}{32}+\frac{6}{64}+\frac{7}{128}+\cdots = 2.$$

== Beyond real and complex numbers ==
While geometric series with real and complex number parameters $a$ and $r$ are most common, geometric series of more general terms such as functions, matrices, and $p$-adic numbers also find application. The mathematical operations used to express a geometric series given its parameters are simply addition and repeated multiplication, and so it is natural, in the context of modern algebra, to define geometric series with parameters from any ring or field. Further generalization to geometric series with parameters from semirings is more unusual, but also has applications; for instance, in the study of fixed-point iteration of transformation functions, as in transformations of automata via rational series.

In order to analyze the convergence of these general geometric series, then on top of addition and multiplication, one must also have some metric of distance between partial sums of the series. This can introduce new subtleties into the questions of convergence, such as the distinctions between uniform convergence and pointwise convergence in series of functions, and can lead to strong contrasts with intuitions from the real numbers, such as in the convergence of the series $1+2+4+8+\cdots$ with $a=1$ and $r = 2$ to
$$\frac{a }{ 1-r } = -1$$
in the 2-adic numbers using the 2-adic absolute value as a convergence metric. In that case, the 2-adic absolute value of the common coefficient is $|r|_2 = |2|_2 = \tfrac12$, and while this is counterintuitive from the perspective of real number absolute value (where $|2| = 2,$ naturally), it is nonetheless well-justified in the context of p-adic analysis.

When the multiplication of the parameters is not commutative, as it often is not for matrices or general physical operators, particularly in quantum mechanics, then the standard way of writing the geometric series,

$$a + ar + ar^2 + ar^3 + \cdots,$$

multiplying from the right, may need to be distinguished from the alternative

$$a + ra + r^2a + r^3a + \cdots,$$

multiplying from the left, and also the symmetric

$$a + r^\frac12 ar^\frac12 + rar + r^\frac32 ar^\frac32 + \cdots,$$

multiplying half on each side. These choices may correspond to important alternatives with different strengths and weaknesses in applications, as in the case of ordering the mutual interferences of drift and diffusion differently at infinitesimal temporal scales in Ito integration and Stratonovitch integration in stochastic calculus.
