= Emilio Elizalde =

Spanish physicist (born 1950)

- Born: 8 March 1950 (age 75); Spain
- Education: University of Barcelona
- Scientific career
- Fields: Gravitational physics General relativity.

Emilio Elizalde (born 8 March 1950) is a Spanish physicist working in the fields of gravitational physics and general relativity.

Of Basque heritage, he was born in Balaguer, about 25 km northeast of Lleida, the province capital. He finished double undergraduate majors in Physics and Mathematics at the University of Barcelona in 1972 and 1973, followed by a masters and later a Ph.D. (1976) degree at the same institution. In 1977, he married Maria Carmen Torrent, who is currently Professor of Applied Physics at the Technical University of Catalonia. The years immediately after the death of Franco were chaotic, offering young academics few opportunities, and so Elizalde spent his postdoctoral years abroad with Rudolf Haag at the II. Institut für Theoretische Physik of the Hamburg University. Later, he was to return to the Department of Theoretical Physics of the University of Barcelona as a faculty member.

In 1992, he obtained a research position at the Spanish Higher Research Council (CSIC), combining this position with collaborative research and teaching at the University of Barcelona. His well-regarded book Ten Physical Applications of Spectral Zeta Functions (1995) was written during the period of his association with CSIC. Although supposedly an "elementary" book on the subject, this book includes an important generalization of the Chowla–Selberg formula.

In 1996, Elizade was a founding scientist in the creation of the "Institut d’Estudis Espacials de Catalunya" (IEEC), a research structure created by the Catalan Government, and in 1999, he played a key role in founding the Institute of Space Sciences (ICE, "Institut de Ciències de l'Espai").

As of 2013, he is still employed at the Institut de Ciències de l'Espai. Elizalde received the Gold Medal of Tomsk State Pedagogical University, where he also obtained an honorary professorship. Elizalde is editor-in-chief of Galaxies and member of the editorial boards of several other journals, including the Journal of Physics A.

As of November 2013, the Astrophysics Data System lists 3035 citations to his publications (self-citations excluded), giving him an h-index of 38.

On 8–10 March 2010, in celebration of Elizalde's 60th birthday, a conference was organized to discuss current progress in the main areas of his research: cosmology, quantum vacuum fluctuations and zeta functions. A volume of proceedings was published.
