= 2007 vole plague in Castile and León =

Incident of rodent overpopulation in Spain

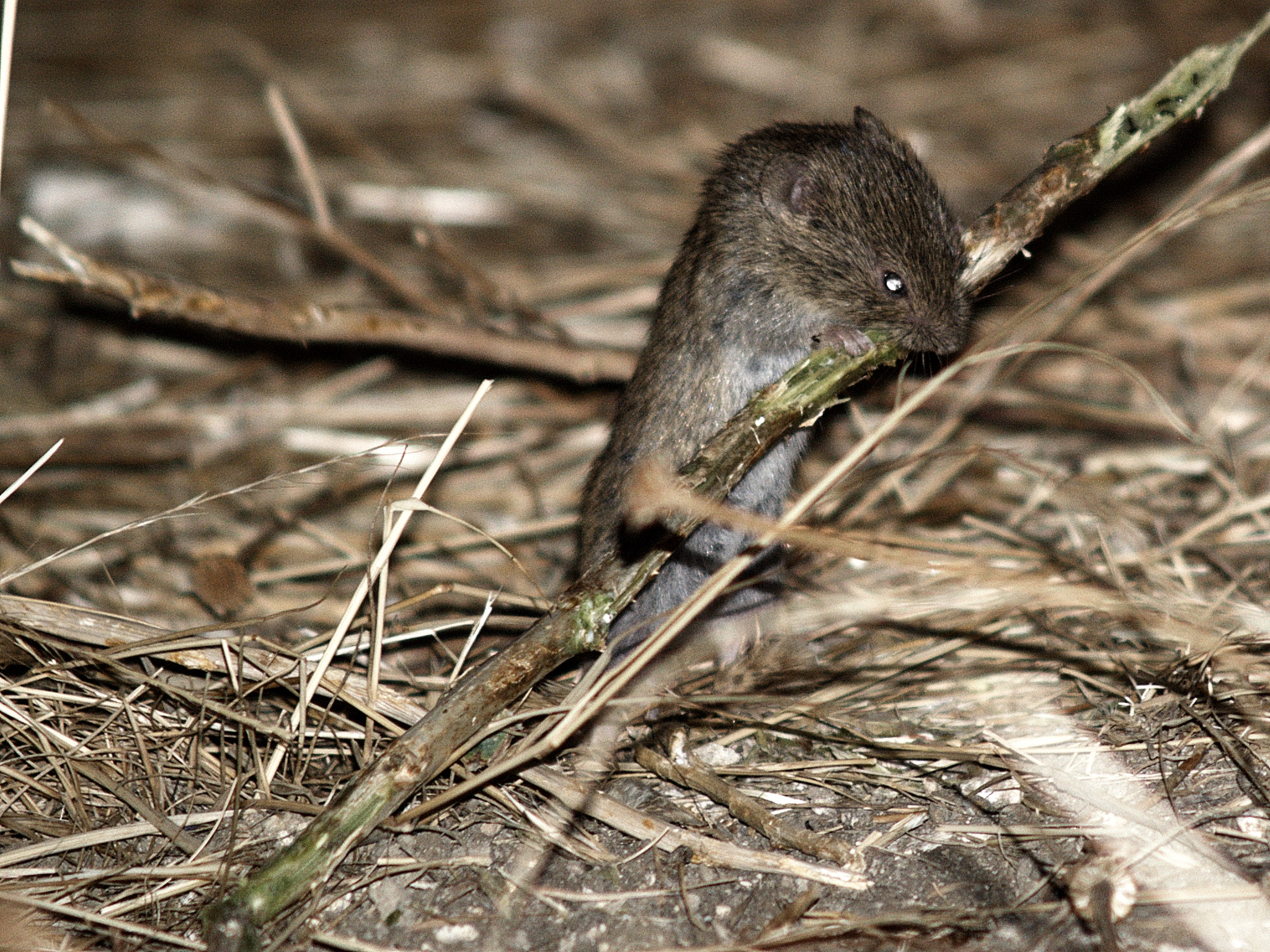
Vole in action in the town of Campaspero, Valladolid, one of the towns affected by the plague.

The 2007 vole plague originated in early summer 2006 in the province of Palencia, located in the autonomous community of Castile and León, Spain. By the summer of 2007, rodent populations had severely devastated crops in the plateau fields. Following a summer marked by significant agricultural losses, the density of voles decreased by September 2007, leading to the institutional declaration that the plague was over. However, vole populations remained abundant in the months that followed. It was only the winter frosts and low temperatures in November and December that reduced their numbers to normal levels.

The common vole (Microtus arvalis) was primarily responsible for the crop devastation across the northern plateau. This Eurasian species had previously been confined to the Cantabrian Mountains, where it differentiated into the subspecies called Microtus arvalis asturianus. Over time, it expanded its habitat southward, escaping its natural predators, particularly birds of prey. Under normal conditions, the population of common voles did not exceed 100 million; however, estimates for the summer of 2007 suggested their numbers had surged to at least 700 million. The voles affected approximately 500,000 hectares of crops, resulting in estimated losses of 15 million euros. Their voracity led to their characterization as a significant agricultural pest in Castile.

The plague affected the entire community of Castile and León, with the provinces of Valladolid, Segovia, Palencia, and Zamora experiencing the most severe impacts. The areas of Tierra de Campos and the region bordering Tierra de Medina were particularly affected, extending into the municipalities of Aliste and nearing the border with Portugal.

== Causes ==
Vole next to its burrow.

The 2007 vole plague was driven by several factors that led to the devastation of crops, particularly beets, potatoes, onions, and carrots. Despite the typically harsh winters in the Meseta region of the Iberian Peninsula, the winter of 2007 experienced unusually high temperatures, resulting in a significant reduction in frost occurrences. This, combined with a warmer-than-average spring, facilitated a population explosion of voles. These rodents mature rapidly, reproducing frequently with multiple offspring per litter and several litters each year, enabling their populations to grow swiftly.

Additionally, environmental groups filed a complaint with the Junta of Castile and León in March 2007 regarding the use of poison to combat the emerging vole population. The Young Farmers Association (Asociación de Jóvenes Agricultores, ASAJA) attributed the severity of the crisis to the administration and these environmental groups, claiming that the halting of preventive measures could have mitigated the outbreak's impact.

Voles are known to transmit diseases to humans, such as tularemia, through direct contact or via dust particles contaminated with their feces. The plague has been linked to 42 officially recognized cases in the region, according to the Junta of Castile and León, while the PSOE of Castile and León has suggested that the actual number may be as high as 270. Consequently, the regional government has advised against the consumption of game during the hunting season due to concerns over potential infection from this disease.

== Extent of the vole by province ==
Under typical conditions, the population density of common voles (Microtus arvalis) ranges from 5 to 10 individuals per hectare. However, during the vole plague in Castile and León, densities reached alarming levels, with reports of up to 1,500 rodents per hectare in the most affected areas.

The province of Palencia, where the outbreak originated, was the hardest hit, followed closely by Valladolid and Zamora. In contrast, the province of Soria experienced the least impact from the plague, indicating significant regional variability in the extent of the infestation.

High concentration
Average concentration
Low concentration
Province of León

Province of Palencia

Province of Burgos
Province of Zamora

Province of Valladolid

Province of Soria
Province of Salamanca

Province of Ávila

Province of Segovia

== Consequences of common vole infestations. ==
From an ecological perspective, population explosions of common voles (Microtus arvalis) yield both beneficial and detrimental effects. Vole burrows can enhance soil fertility by increasing organic matter, such as buried vegetation, feces, and decomposing bodies. This activity improves soil aeration and creates a more spongy texture, which facilitates water filtration and promotes edaphological processes. Some researchers have noted that the abundance of voles in Castile and León over recent decades has contributed positively to the faunal diversity of the Douro Valley.

However, voles can also pose significant threats. They are known carriers of various diseases that affect both humans and other animals. Specific diseases associated with Microtus arvalis include viral diseases such as rabies and hantavirus, as well as bacterial diseases like leptospirosis (or Weil's disease), listeriosis, borreliosis (or Lyme disease), and tularemia. Additionally, voles host numerous parasites, including protozoa (babesiosis) to helminths (hydatidosis).

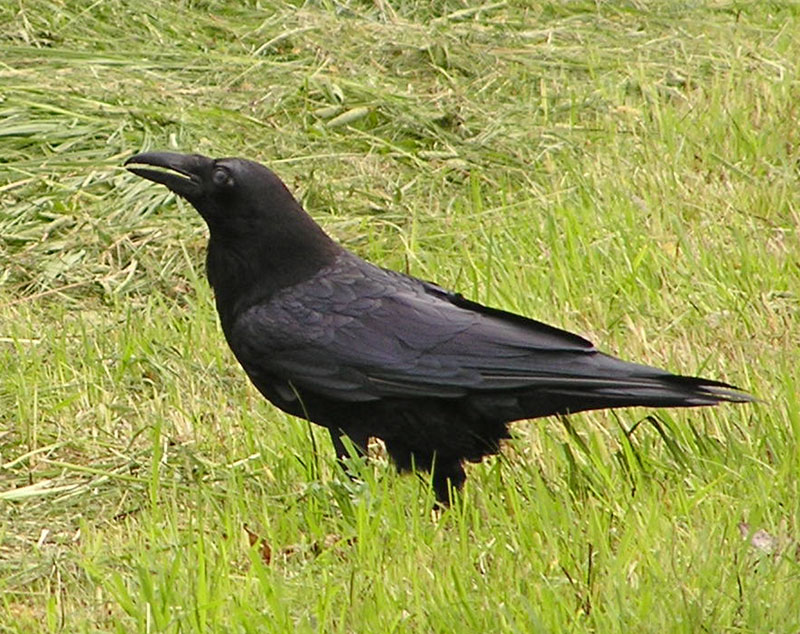
The common raven is one of the natural enemies of voles.

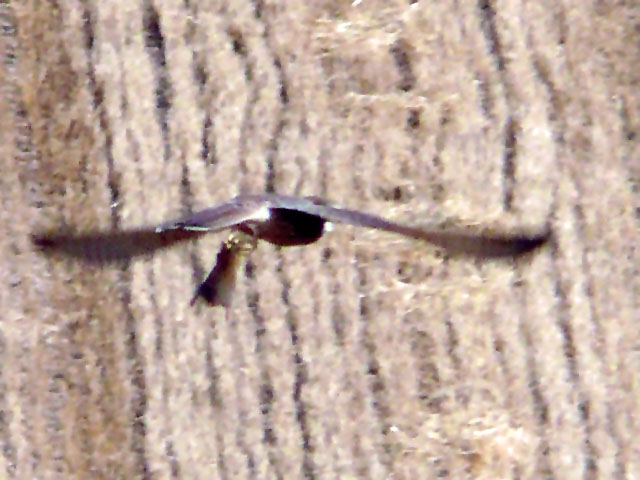
Hen harrier flying with a vole in its talons.

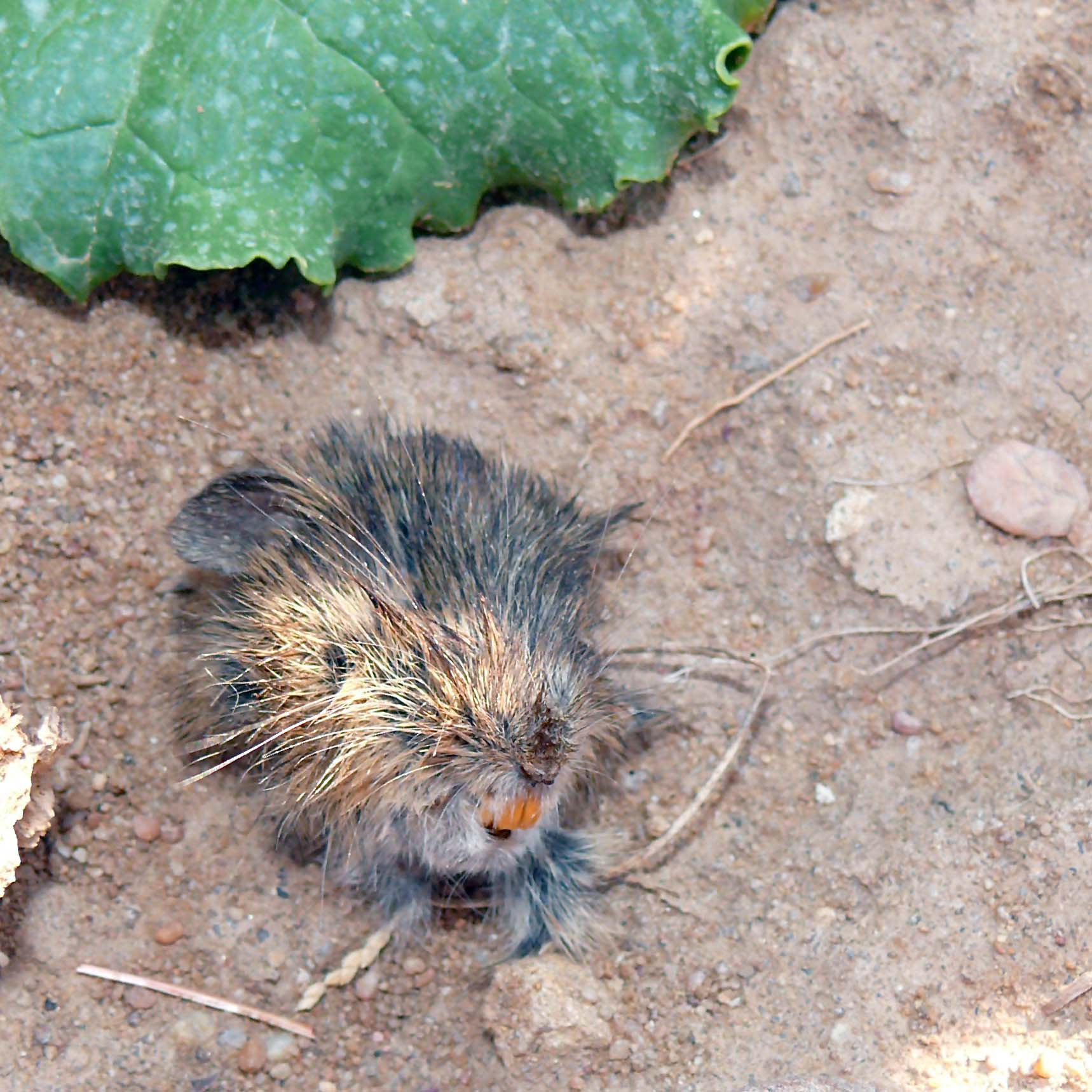
Remains of a vole devoured by a predator (only the head remains).

The presence of abundant prey can support predator populations, offering ample food sources and alleviating predation pressure on other species. However, since vole population outbreaks tend to be short-lived compared to the life cycles of many predators, a rebound effect can occur when vole numbers decline. (Note: See the case of the Short-eared Owl (Asio flammeus).) Some specialists assert that the impact of mammalian predators is more significant than that of migratory birds, with species like the weasel exhibiting population dynamics closely mirroring those of voles. In short, if the number of animals that need to feed on meat increases, eventually they will target other animals, sometimes attacking endangered species that are vulnerable or of particular interest to humans.

Although Grouse breeding was enhanced by spikes in mouse populations, there was no residual effect on population size. Instead, there were fewer adult western capercaillie in post-spike years in mouse populations, especially in July counts, because neither foxes nor martens were eliminated. One possible explanation is that predators bred more successfully when mouse populations were abundant, and then killed more tetraonids in winters or at the beginning of the following breeding season.

For humans, these population explosions are often viewed as harmful plagues, leading to various repercussions in the economy, public health, leisure activities, and societal dynamics. The situation can incite social alarm and political debate, with different ideological groups using the issue as a focal point for conflict.

=== Consequences for harvests ===
The common vole (Microtus arvalis) is recognized as one of the most damaging vertebrates for agriculture across Europe, including Spain. This species is prevalent throughout the Northern Hemisphere, contributing to significant agricultural challenges. The primary diet of common voles consists of tender green stems, though they also consume leaves and remnants of crops such as corn. The 2007 vole plague is believed to have originated in Tierra de Campos, Palencia, and subsequently spread throughout the autonomous community of Castile and León . It has been estimated that more than 200,000 hectares were affected during this outbreak, with potential agricultural losses exceeding one million euros.

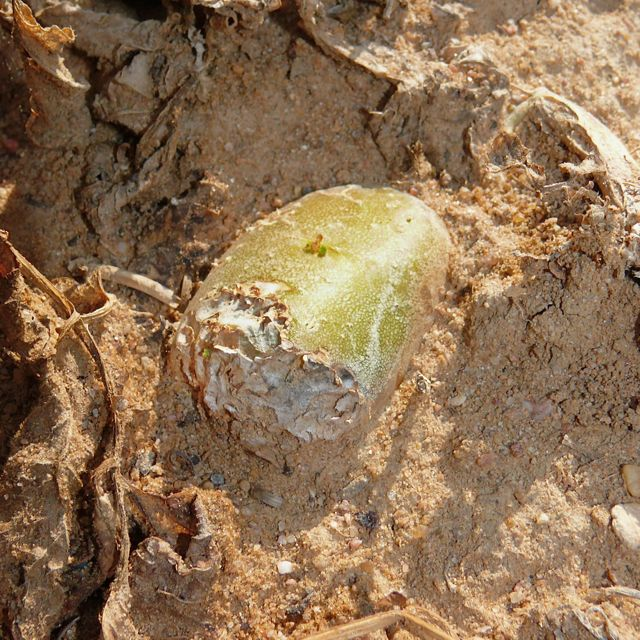
Potato.

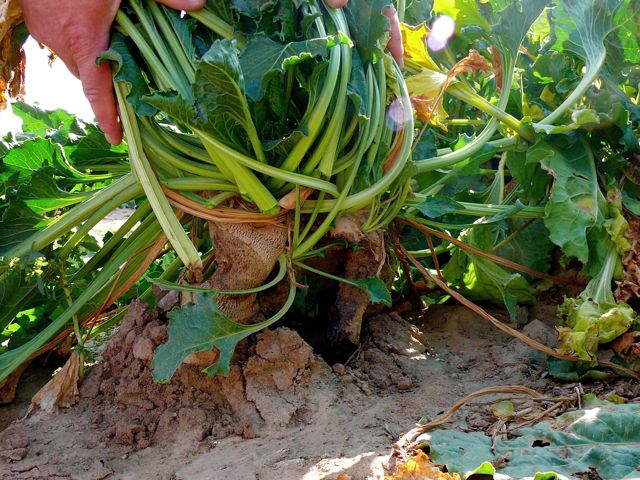
Beet.

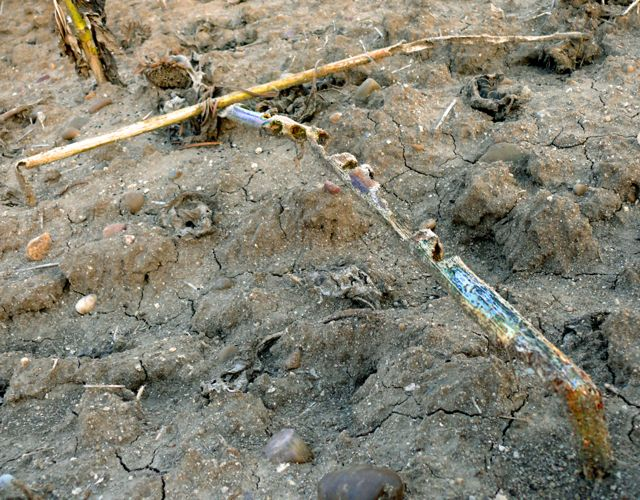
Sunflower.

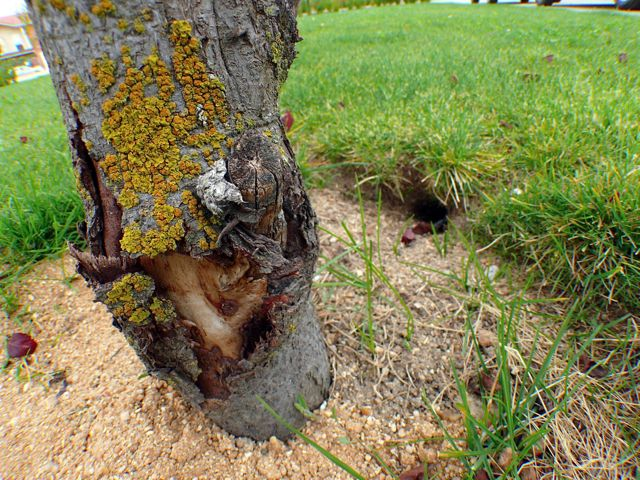
Tree.

During the sowing season, common voles create burrows in ditches and field borders to evade plowing. After sowing, they tend to move into the interior of arable land, particularly in cereal and pasture fields, leading to the formation of empty stands. Data from the United States indicate that a density of approximately 200 rodents per hectare can result in a 5% loss of alfalfa. This figure is likely exceeded during vole outbreaks in Castile, illustrating the potential scale of damage. In addition to cereals, common voles also feed on beets, typically consuming the tuber and causing rapid decay of the plant. They gnaw the stems of sunflowers, leading to their collapse, and have been observed feeding in vineyards. While they generally target tender shoots, damage to the base of vine shoots can adversely affect future harvests. Often, the full extent of the damage may not become evident until it is too late for corrective measures. Common voles also pose a threat to fruit trees by gnawing at the bark at the base of their trunks, which can weaken or destroy the trees.

=== Health consequences ===
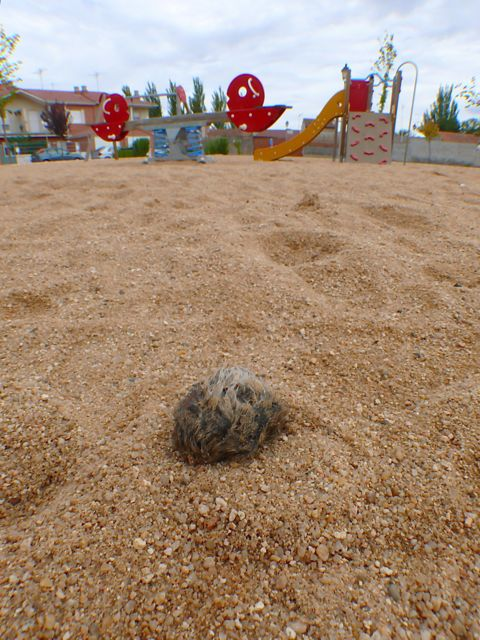
A vole carcass appeared in the sandbox of a children's playground, a common occurrence in rural Castile and León during the summer of 2007.

Rodents comprise nearly half of all known mammalian species and are significant contributors to human health challenges, serving as a major natural reservoir for zoonotic pathogens—diseases that can be transmitted from animals to humans. Common voles (Microtus arvalis) are particularly active zoonotic agents, especially during population surges when contact with humans and domestic animals is more likely. (Note: One of the diseases that cause most social alarm is Tularemia.)

Many risks associated with pathogen transmission from rodents are linked to recreational activities, which have often received less attention than economic impacts. Rodent plagues frequently coincide with holiday periods, exposing children and teenagers in rural areas to large populations of voles in parks, gardens, and urban green spaces. Despite their less aggressive nature compared to house mice or rats, common voles can create a misleading sense of safety, leading to increased interactions such as chasing or capturing them for amusement. This behavior poses significant risks, including potential exposure to serious diseases, as children may encounter decomposing vole carcasses in play areas, where parasites like fleas and ticks can thrive. Additionally, voles may drown in swimming pools or irrigation reservoirs, raising further health concerns.

Another associated risk involves small game hunting. The Junta of Castile and León has issued guidelines to mitigate issues related to rodent pests. Historically, these concerns were often dismissed as minor nuisances primarily affecting farmers. (Note: Recommendations of the Junta of Castile and Leon before the opening of the hunting season (In Spanish)) However, incidents involving poisoned dogs or hunters contracting diseases like tularemia have raised alarm. The lack of foresight from hunting organizations and authorities has led to increased tension and blame among stakeholders, highlighting the need for better management strategies regarding rodent populations and associated health risks.

=== Administrative consequences ===
The inaction of the Junta of Castile and León in addressing the rapid expansion of the common vole plague prompted widespread protests among farmers. On August 2, thousands gathered in front of the Junta's headquarters in Valladolid to demand urgent solutions.

In the absence of timely administrative intervention, farmers took matters into their own hands. They began digging ditches filled with water to drown the voles, with Villalar de los Comuneros in Valladolid spearheading these efforts. The town’s mayor even devised a plow designed to destroy the rodents' burrows. However, these grassroots solutions proved insufficient in mitigating the plague's impact.

Institutional measures were implemented belatedly on August 9, by which time voles had already infiltrated urban areas in several localities. The first action taken was the burning of stover, initiated in Fresno el Viejo, Valladolid.

The plague's effects extended into the wine industry, causing an estimated 40% loss in the grape harvest, which compounded the anticipated losses in the livestock sector. As a result, many local mayors requested the declaration of a catastrophe zone to facilitate a more coordinated response to the crisis.

== Cyclical plagues of common voles in Castile and León ==
The phenomenon of common vole (Microtus arvalis) "plagues" was largely unknown in Spain until recent decades. Naturalist Juan Delibes de Castro noted in 1989 that, historically, vole populations in Spain were quite small, primarily located in specific mountainous areas. He remarked:

In Spain, the populations of the common vole (Microtus arvalis) were until now very small and were located in certain mountainous enclaves. However, in the present decade they have expanded massively, causing notable crop losses.

Research conducted in the 1970s by biologist José Rey found this species restricted to the southern slopes of the Cantabrian mountain range and the Sierra de Albarracín and Sierra de Javalambre. These findings were corroborated by other specialists, suggesting that the species may have expanded down river valleys in the north where alfalfa groves were plentiful. Reports of Microtus arvalis began to emerge in the province of Valladolid in the early 1980s.

Since that time, demographic explosions of voles have occurred every three to four years in the Douro Valley, leading to significant agricultural harm. Under normal conditions, the estimated population density of voles in the Castilian steppe is between 5 and 10 individuals per hectare. However, during periods of overabundance, densities can exceed 200 individuals per hectare. Notably, Delibes de Castro conducted a sampling in October 1983 in several farms in the province of Burgos, recording up to 1,294 voles per hectare in alfalfa, 382 per hectare in cereal crops, and 182 per hectare in less cultivated areas. (Note: Although there are no definitive reports, it is estimated that in 2007 the concentrations of country voles are between 1500 and 2000 individuals per hectare: verbal statements made to various media by both the German specialist Jacob Hensen and the Minister of Agriculture of the Junta of Castile and Leon, Silvia Clemente.)

Density of voles per hectare

Specialist Ángel María Arenaz suggests that the demographic magnitude of vole infestations can be predicted through winter counts. According to his research, if vole populations exceed 50 individuals per hectare in January, a dangerous level of infestation is likely to occur in the summer. Conversely, lower counts indicate a normal situation without imminent risk of invasion. Arenaz also notes that forecasts can be refined based on autumn rainfall, as heavier precipitation can be detrimental to vole reproduction. To make accurate predictions for a given agricultural year, periodic censuses using approved traps should be conducted in alfalfa fields during September, February, May, and August.

Naturalist Juan Carlos Blanco points out that comprehensive information on this subject is lacking in Spain, with data primarily available for specific regions, such as the Pyrenees, or derived from extrapolations of studies conducted in neighboring countries. Despite the recurring nature of these demographic explosions, reliable data and a clear understanding of their causes remain elusive.

Regarding the summer 2007 vole infestation, which was noted to be one of the most intense recorded, the Junta of Castile and León gathered information based on reports from municipal agrarian chambers and farmers' associations. However, these estimates are not comprehensive, as a complete study of the situation has not been conducted. The infestation was officially declared a plague through an order issued on March 27, 2007.

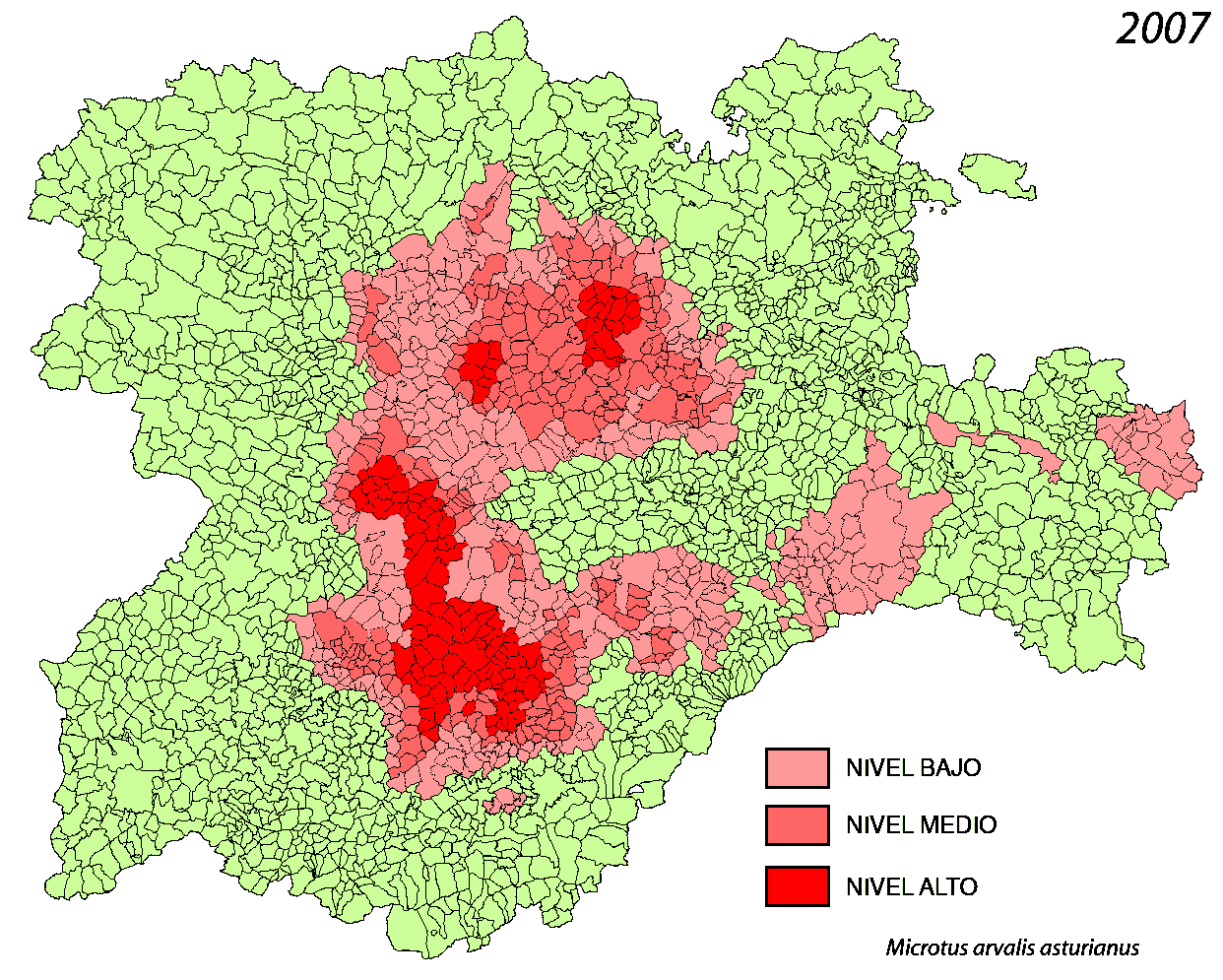
Dispersion of voles in the summer of 2007 in Castile and León. (based on data from the Instituto Tecnológico Agrario de la Junta de Castilla y León).

Some rural inhabitants have accused environmental movements of "repopulating" the land with hatchery specimens of common voles (Microtus arvalis) to support raptor populations. This belief extends to the now-defunct ICONA, with accusations that the autonomous administration has ignored the issue, favoring certain ideological groups over agricultural interests. As a result, it is challenging to convince farmers that vole population surges are primarily due to natural ecological processes. Fernando Franco Jubete explains this legend with the following words:

[...] voles are beings created in laboratories and reproduced by millions in unknown farms to be released, as food for raptors, from mysterious SUVs and helicopters. Consequently, the guilty parties are those who consent, finance and execute it: "the Government", "the Environment", "ICONA", "the ecologists".

— Jubete 2007 (Note: Cyclical plague of voles)

The increase in vole populations benefits a wide range of predators, including nocturnal raptors like owls, mustelids such as weasels, and diurnal raptors such as the black-winged kite. Additionally, generalist predators—including raptors, canids, felids, corvids, storks, and herons—also benefit from the abundance of voles. This situation can reduce pressure on other prey species, allowing populations of partridges, quails, rabbits, and other small animals to thrive. However, the rise in predator numbers can lead to complex ecological dynamics. Some predators, particularly certain raptors, are migratory or opportunistic and may not specialize in voles. If these predators leave the area when vole populations decline, the impact on their survival may be minimal. In contrast, stable predator populations that adapt to decreased vole availability may shift their focus to alternative prey. This change can create a rebound effect, leading to increased predation on other species and potentially disrupting local ecosystems.

The expansion of common vole populations is thought to have originated in areas where native populations were already dense and stable. This expansion likely required a dispersing stimulus and favorable transmission routes, such as land consolidation, improvements in the transport network, and the expansion of irrigation in the river valleys. Once established in regions like the Douro Valley, alfalfa fields—preferred habitats for voles—could serve as shelters, creating conditions conducive to population outbreaks. The hypotheses considered about the triggering of this phenomenon are as follows:

- Phenotypic Influence of Vegetation: Some specialists suggest that the increased availability of irrigated land, particularly for crops like alfalfa and sugar beet, has positively influenced vole fertility. Over the past two decades, as irrigation in the Douro Valley has expanded, so too have reports of vole infestations. However, population fluctuations are often related to localized improvements in habitat rather than a cyclical pattern. Under typical conditions, voles only consume a small percentage of available plant material, with insects accounting for a significant portion of consumption.
- Predation Dynamics: Another hypothesis posits that the lack of natural predators can lead to unchecked vole population growth. Predation is considered crucial in regulating the abundance cycles of microtines. When predator populations are low, rodents can proliferate rapidly. Over time, as vole populations increase, predators may respond by reproducing and concentrating in areas with abundant prey. Eventually, these carnivores can significantly reduce vole numbers. However, as prey diminishes, predators may struggle to find alternative food sources, leading to a decline in their populations and creating conditions for another potential population explosion of voles in subsequent years.
- Endogenous Factors: It is also proposed that internal mechanisms within vole populations can lead to overabundance. While voles possess high reproductive capacities, these are often suppressed, resulting in stable populations. However, in certain conditions, unrestricted reproduction can occur, leading to intense competition for resources such as space and food. Many individuals may fail to integrate into social structures or secure territories, becoming marginal members of the population. These marginal individuals often face increased stress, leading to elevated adrenal hormone levels that can reduce reproductive capacity and heighten susceptibility to disease.

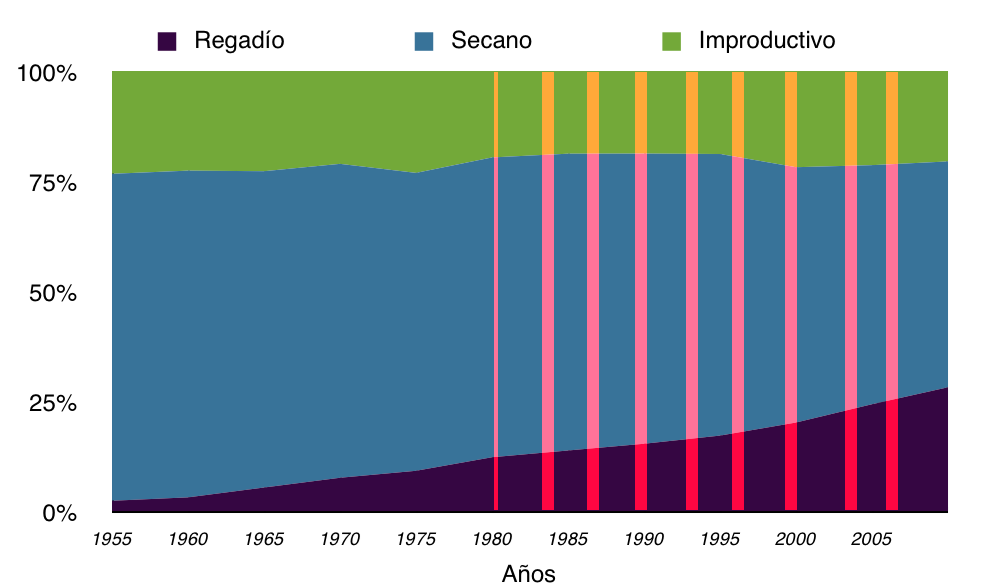
Evolution of cultivated areas and vole infestations in the south of the province of Valladolid. Source: Cámaras agrarias de la Comarca de Medina del Campo.

It is crucial to distinguish between the causes of the common vole's expansion from mountainous environments to the Douro Valley, which emerged as a habitat in the early 1980s, and the factors that contribute to periodic reproductive peaks. Human activities play a significant role in shaping rodent populations by inadvertently creating favorable conditions through agricultural practices that cultivate their preferred food sources and develop suitable habitats. The initial colonization of the Northern Plateau can be attributed to these changes; however, the subsequent demographic booms and the cyclical fluctuations observed in vole populations are more complex. These phenomena are influenced by both internal factors, such as social behaviors and reproductive dynamics within the vole population, and external factors, including predation pressures and food availability.

== Pest control and its effects ==
An essential condition for effectively combating any type of pest is to gather comprehensive information regarding their causes, life cycles, and development patterns. Each pest situation is unique, and solutions cannot be universally applied. Identifying the responsible party for the damage is the first critical step, followed by prompt action. In Spain, there is a notable lack of updated, in-depth studies on pest management, often forcing reliance on older publications or experiences from other countries. Additionally, while there is a wealth of information available online and in the media, much of it is biased or not applicable to local contexts, with only a few exceptions.

According to biologist Juan José Luque-Larena, of the Escuela Técnica Superior de Ingenierías Agrarias of the University of Valladolid:

There is an absolute lack of rigor, a lot of confusion and no research. When avian flu appeared, there was no question that it was necessary to investigate, but anyone can talk about voles.

=== Preventive measures ===
The management of a vole population in an advanced state of proliferation is challenging, and while complete eradication may not be feasible, population numbers can be contained, localized outbreaks may be eliminated, and damage can be mitigated. Prevention is crucial, with the first step being a census of harmful animal populations.

Censuses of common voles (Microtus arvalis) should be conducted in regions that are typically prone to infestations, using approved trapping methods or observational techniques. The results of these censuses can serve as an important indicator of future population trends. For instance, if vole populations in January do not exceed 50 individuals per hectare, the risk of a pest outbreak is considered low. Conversely, if this threshold is surpassed, particularly during mild winters, proactive measures should be initiated to prevent an infestation.

In periods of food scarcity, the use of poison—administered under the supervision of relevant authorities—can be an effective control method, as voles have limited resistance to bait during winter months.

Additional preventive strategies include the protection and support of natural predators of small rodents, such as raptors, weasels, foxes, and storks. Legal protections for raptors and the installation of perches or nesting sites can enhance their presence in agricultural areas, contributing to natural pest control.

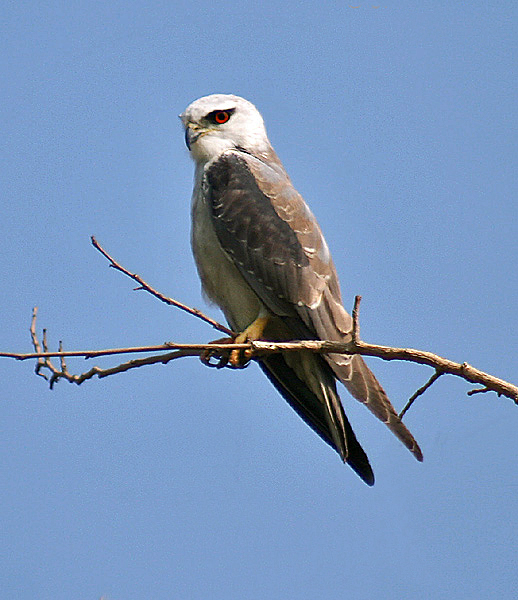
Black-winged Kite on its natural perch.

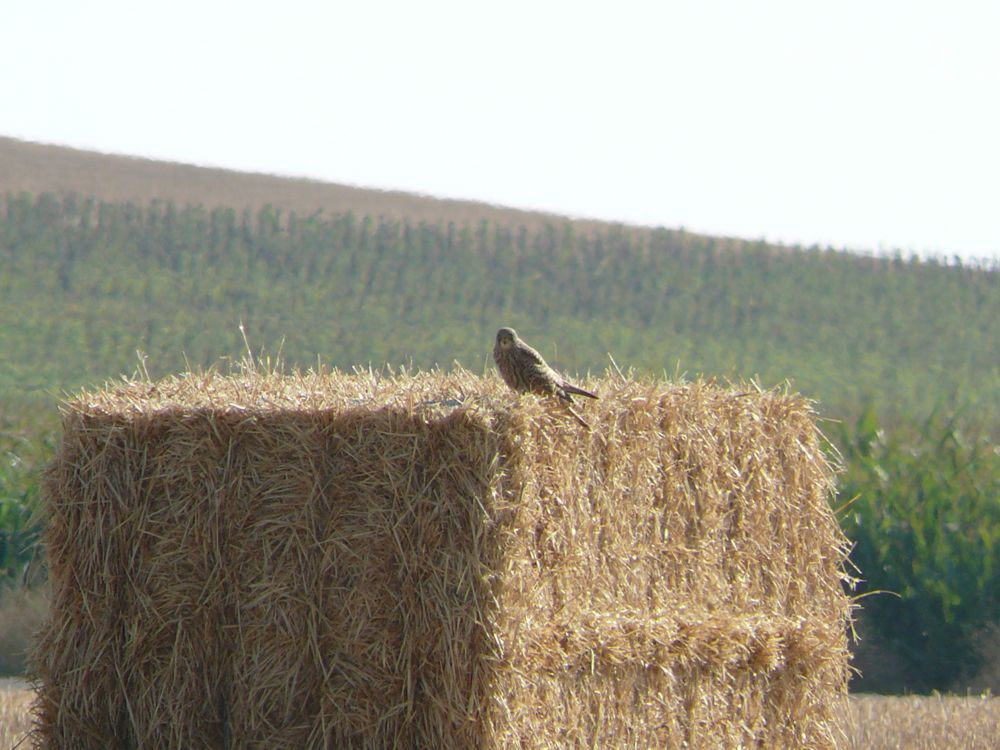
Straw bales are improvised perches for raptors.

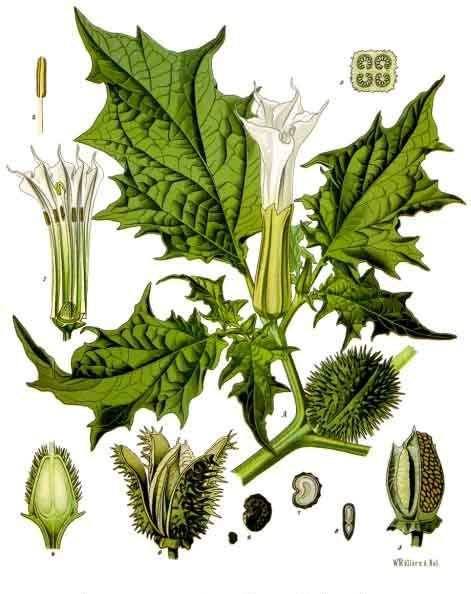
The fruit of the stramonium, a plant that is often ignored by voles.

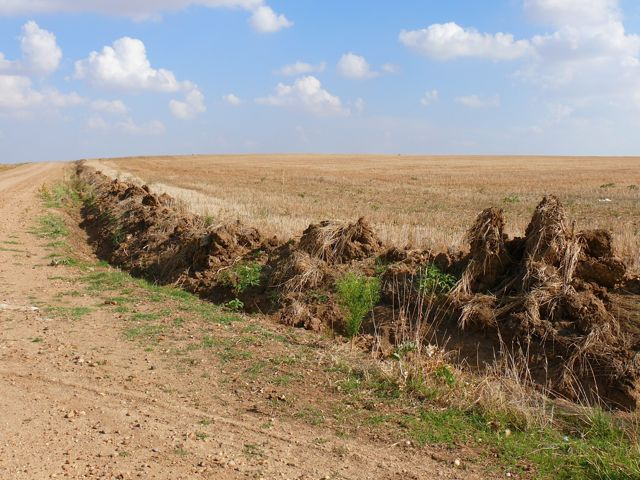
Deep cleaning of ditches to eliminate burrows.

For small farms, the use of repellent plants can serve as an effective palliative against vole infestations. Certain Solanaceae, such as Datura Stramonium (Stramonium) and Atropa belladonna (belladonna), contain toxic compounds like atropine, which can deter rodents. Other plants in this family also have similar properties, particularly in their roots. Additionally, plants such as rue, squill, fritillaria, and castor bean can function similarly.

Pest management is often more challenging in monoculture systems, where a single crop type is grown repeatedly. Crop rotation and diversification can help control vole populations. Regular field maintenance, while respecting biodiversity, is also beneficial. Practices such as deep tillage of fallow land, removal of weeds, and cleaning ditches and dry riverbeds can disrupt vole habitats. Encouraging stover grazing by livestock can be particularly effective, as cattle can crush burrows and help clean the ground. Mechanical destruction of burrows, creating food-free zones, and applying chemical repellents can force voles to concentrate in specific areas, making it easier to target them with traps or poisons. In summary, enhancing biodiversity through good agricultural and environmental management is key to reducing vulnerability to pests and preventing infestations.

=== Trapping ===
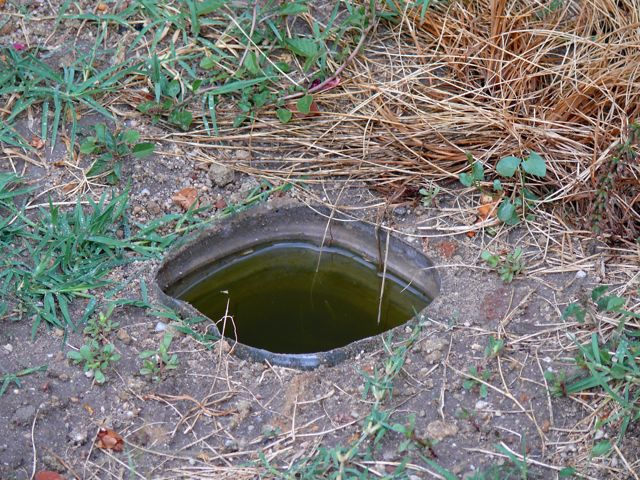
Simple water trap.

Trapping voles can be accomplished through straightforward methods, as they are not capable of jumping or climbing. One common technique involves placing small containers filled with water near their feeding areas, causing them to drown. Additionally, specialized metal boxes developed by the French association I.N.R.A. are also effective for this purpose.

However, trapping is generally ineffective in large agricultural areas. Its utility is primarily limited to smaller, well-managed spaces such as parks, gardens, orchards, and swimming pools. In these controlled environments, trapping can serve as a useful tool for monitoring and managing vole populations.

=== Stover burning ===
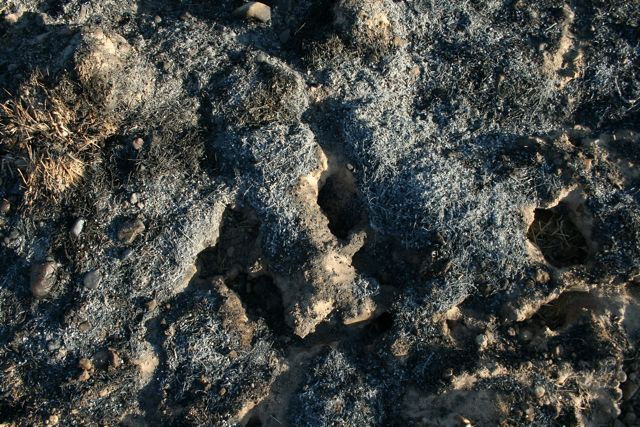
Burrows in burned stover.

In 2005, the Spanish government implemented a ban on the burning of stover across the country to mitigate the risk of forest fires, as outlined in Royal Decree 11/2005. In response to the vole plague of 2007, several agricultural associations requested permission to reinstate this practice as a method of controlling the rodent population. While such permission has not been granted, the Junta of Castile and León has initiated controlled burning experiments in specific areas to assess its effectiveness against the plague, particularly in regions where irrigation is prevalent or where there are designated agricultural product origins.

Initial observations suggest that burning straw does not generate sufficient heat to eliminate voles, as temperatures only reach about 200 °C, affecting only the upper 10 centimeters of soil. Consequently, most voles can escape to their burrows during burning.

Agricultural organizations, including ASAJA, COAG, UCCL, and UPA, with input from engineer Fernando Franco Jubete, argue that sporadic burning is ineffective and that a more widespread application is necessary to compel voles to seek refuge in designated firebreaks where chemical control measures could be applied.

While burning may temporarily deter voles due to the lack of food and shelter, it poses significant ecological risks. The process adversely affects other species, killing microorganisms in the topsoil that are essential for aeration and fertility. This can lead to increased sulfur and carbon levels while depleting nitrogen, necessitating additional fertilizers to balance soil pH. The small fauna, including reptiles, insects, and birds, are significantly impacted and may disappear from burned areas. Moreover, voles often relocate to less affected farms, potentially spreading the infestation further.

=== Chemical measures ===
Anticoagulant poisons, such as Chlorophacinone, are commonly employed to manage pest populations, including voles. The Junta of Castile and León authorized the distribution of Chlorophacinone in various forms, including liquid, paste, granulated cereal, and flavored blocks. (Note: Other legal (second generation) anticoagulants are Bromadiolone and Difenacoum, both coumarin derivatives, but Difenacoum is not indicated for voles but for mice. Moreover, a second generation anticoagulant is even more toxic than Chlorophacinone for birds or large mammals. Brodifacoum is also legal, but it is very harmful and difficult to handle, it is granted the highest toxicological classification, so it is only used in closed places, such as warehouses.) This substance is currently under evaluation by the European Commission for potential approval or prohibition, but it remains legal and is listed in the Register of Phytosanitary Products by the Ministry of Agriculture, Fisheries, and Food.

While there are no specific studies in Spain on Chlorophacinone's efficacy, research conducted by the U.S. Environmental Protection Agency suggests that as a first-generation anticoagulant, it poses greater risks to small mammals than to birds or livestock, although susceptibility varies with exposure levels. Notably, Chlorophacinone's toxicity diminishes in humid conditions. However, there is a considerable risk to a range of wildlife, particularly birds such as bustards, larks, calandra larks, partridges, and various waterfowl, as well as mammals like rabbits and hares, which exhibit high mortality rates. The poison has also been shown to adversely affect lambs among livestock.

In March 2007, amid a widespread vole infestation in Tierra de Campos (Province of Palencia), the Junta of Castile y León distributed Chlorophacinone over 20,000 hectares. However, the application was poorly managed, leading to unintended consequences for non-target species, including pigeons, lagomorphs, alaudidae, wild boars, and protected birds. Environmental organizations, including WWF/Adena, criticized the Junta for endangering public health, and complaints were filed against the Territorial Service of Agriculture and Livestock of Palencia. Subsequently, investigations were initiated by the Public Prosecutor's Office of the Court of Palencia, with support from the Nature Protection Service (SEPRONA) and the Department of Toxicology at the University of León. An attestation of SEPRONA informs about the provisional results of their investigations:

We consider that these animals are a risk to public health and should in no case be consumed by the population until the massive use of this rodenticide ceases.

Fernando Franco Jubete, an agricultural engineer, publicly opposed the widespread use of Chlorophacinone, labeling it an "ecological barbarity" that failed to resolve the pest issue.

Domiciano Pastor, secretary general of the Union de Pequeños Agricultores (UPA) of Palencia, noted that warnings about the risks had been sent to the Junta as early as September 2006, but the response was inadequate. He emphasized that while not all deaths were significant, the flawed method of application was concerning and should not be repeated.

== End of the plague ==
By early 2008, the vole population in Castile and León had returned to normal levels following a significant outbreak. The Junta of Castile and León, led by Minister of Agriculture and Livestock Silvia Clemente, invested approximately 24 million euros to combat the infestation. However, subsequent assessments revealed that the poisons used in the control efforts were largely ineffective, and the vole population normalized primarily due to self-regulation mechanisms. Climatological factors also played a crucial role in this recovery, as noted by the mayor of Fresno el Viejo, one of the areas most affected by the plague.

== See also ==
- Integrated pest management
- Rotterdam Convention
- Reed vole#Relationship with humans – 2007 reed vole plague in China

== Bibliography ==
- Arenaz Erburu, Ángel María (2001). "El topillo campesino y el topillo de montaña". Daños en la agricultura causados por vertebrados (in Spanish). Ediciones Mundi-Prensa, Ministerio de agricultura, pesca y alimentación. pp. 61–66. ISBN 84-491-0490-4.
- Arenaz Erburu, Ángel María (2006). "El topillo campesino (Microtus arvalis)". Control de vertebrados perjudiciales en Agricultura (in Spanish). Madrid: Junta de Castilla y León, Consejería de agricultura y ganadería. Madrid. pp. 74–79. ISBN 84-9718-407-6.
- Ayarzagüena, J.; Ibáñez, J. I.; San Miguel, A. (1976). "Notas sobre la distribución y ecología de Microtus cabrerae Thomas, 1906". Doñana, Acta Vertebrata (in Spanish) (3): 105–108.
- Blanco, Juan Carlos (1998). Mamíferos de España, segundo tomo (in Spanish). Editorial Planeta, S. A. pp. 239–243. ISBN 84-08-02827-8.
- Chapuis, J. L. (2001). "Eradication of rabbits (Oryctolagus cuniculus) by poisoning on three islands of the subantarctic Kerguelen Archipelago". Wildlife Research. 28 (3): 323–331. doi:10.1071/WR00042.
- Davis, S. A. et alter (2004). "On the economic benefit of predicting rodent outbreaks in agricultural systems". Crop Protection. 23 (4): 305–314. doi:10.1016/j.cropro.2003.09.002.
- Delibes de Castro, Juan (1989). "Plagas de topillos en España". Revista Quercus. Observación, estudio y defensa de la Naturaleza (in Spanish). 35 (January 1989): 17–20. ISSN 0212-0054.
- Delibes de Castro, Manuel; Brunett-Lecomte, P. (1989). "Presencia del topillo campesino ibérico (Microtus arvalis asturianus, Miller 1980), en la meseta del Duero". Doñana, Acta Vertebrata (in Spanish). 7: 120–123.
- Dueñas Santero, Mª E.; Peris Álvarez, S. J. (1985). "Clave para los micromamíferos (insectívora y Rodentia) del Centro y Sur de la península ibérica". Claves para la identificación de la fauna española (in Spanish) (27). Department of Zoology. Faculty of Biology. University of Salamanca. ISBN 84-7481-331-X.
- Erickson, W.; Urban, D. (2004). Potential risks of nine rodenticies to birds and nontarget mammals: a comparative approach. United States Environmental Protection Agency. Washington D. C. USA.
- González Esteban, Jorge (1996). Estudio bionómico del topillo campesino Microtus arvalis asturianus Miller 1908, en la península ibérica (in Spanish). Tesis doctoral, facultad de Biología, Universidad de Barcelona.
- González-Esteban, Jorge; Jorge y Villate, Idoia (2002). "Microtus Arvalis (pallas, 1778), topillo campesino". In Palomo, L. J.; Gisbert, J. (eds.). Atlas de los Mamíferos terrestres de España (in Spanish). Dirección General de Conservación de la Naturaleza. SECAM-SECEMU, Madrid. pp. 382–385. ISBN 84-8014-431-9.
- Henttonen, Heikki (November 1987). "The Impact of Spacing Behavior in Microtine Rodents on the Dynamics of Least Weasels Mustela nivalis: A Hypothesis". Oikos (3, Trophic Exploitation, Community Structure and Dynamics of Cyclic and Non-Cyclic Populations. Proceedings of a Symposium Held 25–27 May 1985, at Hallnas). 50 (3): 366–370. doi:10.2307/3565497. JSTOR 3565497.
- Kowalski, Kazimierz (1981). Mamíferos. Manual de teriología (in Spanish). H. Blume ediciones. ISBN 84-7214-229-9.
- Krebs, C.J; Lambin, X.; Wolff, J. O. (2007). Wolff, J.O.; Sherman, P.W. (eds.). "Social behavior and self-regulation in murid rodents". Rodent Societies: An Ecological and Evolutionary Perspective. 14. Chicago: University of Chicago Press: 173–181.
- Luque-Larena, Juan José; Baglione, Vittorio; Chiarati, Elisa; Vera, Rubén; Viñuela, Javier; Mateo, Rafael (2007). "Consideraciones científico-técnicas en relación a la campaña de control de la actual explosión demográfica de topillo campesino (Microtus arvalis) en zonas agrícolas de Castilla y León". Comunicado Conjunto de 13 de Febrero de 2007 (in Spanish). Archived from the original on 4 March 2016.
- Marcström, V; Kenward, R. E; Engren, E. (October 1988). "El impacto de la predación sobre tetraónidas boreales durante los ciclos de ratones de campo: un estudio experimental". The Journal of Animal Ecology (in Spanish). 57 (3): 859–872.
- Margalef, Ramón (1982). "El sistema depredador / presa". Ecología (in Spanish). Barcelona: Ediciones Omega S. A.: 641–654. ISBN 84-282-0405-5.
- Palacios, F.; Jubete, F. et alter (1988). "Nuevos datos acerca de la distribución del topillo campesino (Microtus arvalis, Pallars, 1978), en la península ibérica". Doñana, Acta Vertebrata (in Spanish). 15: 169–171.
- del Piero, Fabio; Poppenga, Robert H. (2006). "Chlorophacinone exposure causing an epizootic of acute fatal hemorrhage in lambs". Journal of Veterinary Diagnostic Investigation. 18 (5): 483–485. doi:10.1177/104063870601800512. PMID 17037620. S2CID 36741372.
- Eadie, Robert W.; Nelson, B. K. (1980). "Mamíferos que constituyen plagas". Control de Plantas y Animales. Problemas y Control de Plaga de Vertebrados. Natural Academy of Sciences (in Spanish). 5. Mexico: Editorial Limusa: 99–125. ISBN 968-18-0363-9.
- Roedores perjudiciales para los cultivos (in Spanish). Boletín Fitosanitario. Junta de Castilla y León. 2007.
