= COAG (disambiguation) =

COAG is the Council of Australian Governments.

COAG may also refer to:

- Colorado Attorney General
- Coordinator of Farmers and Ranchers Organizations, a Spanish agricultural professional organisation that provided advice during the 2007 vole plague in Castile and León

== See alswo ==
- Coagulation
