= Padé table =

Array in complex analysis

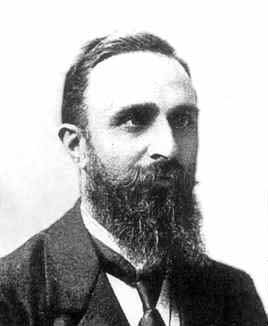
Henri Padé

In complex analysis, a Padé table is an array, possibly of infinite extent, of the rational Padé approximants

R_{m, n}

to a given complex formal power series. Certain sequences of approximants lying within a Padé table can often be shown to correspond with successive convergents of a continued fraction representation of a holomorphic or meromorphic function.

== History ==
Although earlier mathematicians had obtained sporadic results involving sequences of rational approximations to transcendental functions, Frobenius (in 1881) was apparently the first to organize the approximants in the form of a table. Henri Padé further expanded this notion in his doctoral thesis Sur la representation approchee d'une fonction par des fractions rationelles, in 1892. Over the ensuing 16 years Padé published 28 additional papers exploring the properties of his table, and relating the table to analytic continued fractions.

Modern interest in Padé tables was revived by H. S. Wall and Oskar Perron, who were primarily interested in the connections between the tables and certain classes of continued fractions. Daniel Shanks and Peter Wynn published influential papers about 1955, and W. B. Gragg obtained far-reaching convergence results during the '70s. More recently, the widespread use of electronic computers has stimulated a great deal of additional interest in the subject.

== Notation ==
A function f(z) is represented by a formal power series:

$$f(z) = c_0 + c_1 z + c_2 z^2 + \cdots = \sum_{l=0}^\infty c_l z^l,$$

where c_{0} ≠ 0, by convention. The (m, n)th entry R_{m, n} in the Padé table for f(z) is then given by

$$R_{m,n}(z) = \frac{P_m(z)}{Q_n(z)} =
\frac{a_0 + a_1 z + a_2 z^2 + \cdots + a_m z^m}{b_0 + b_1 z + b_2 z^2 + \cdots + b_n z^n}$$

where P_{m}(z) and Q_{n}(z) are polynomials of degrees not more than m and n, respectively. The coefficients {a_{i}} and {b_{i}} can always be found by considering the expression

$$f(z) \approx \sum_{l=0}^{m+n} c_l z^l =: f_{\mathrm{approx}}(z)$$

$$Q_n(z) f_{\mathrm{approx}}(z) = P_m(z)$$

$$Q_n(z) \left(c_0 + c_1 z + c_2 z^2 + \cdots + c_{m+n} z^{m+n} \right) = P_m(z)$$

and equating coefficients of like powers of z up through m + n. For the coefficients of powers m + 1 to m + n, the right hand side is 0 and the resulting system of linear equations contains a homogeneous system of n equations in the n + 1 unknowns b_{i}, and so admits of infinitely many solutions each of which determines a possible Q_{n}. P_{m} is then easily found by equating the first m coefficients of the equation above. However, it can be shown that, due to cancellation, the generated rational functions R_{m, n} are all the same, so that the (m, n)th entry in the Padé table is unique. Alternatively, we may require that b_{0} = 1, thus putting the table in a standard form.

Although the entries in the Padé table can always be generated by solving this system of equations, that approach is computationally expensive. Usage of the Padé table has been extended to meromorphic functions by newer, timesaving methods such as the epsilon algorithm.

== The block theorem and normal approximants ==
Because of the way the (m, n)th approximant is constructed, the difference

Q_{n}(z)f(z) − P_{m}(z)

is a power series whose first term is of degree no less than

m + n + 1.

If the first term of that difference is of degree

m + n + r + 1, r > 0,

then the rational function R_{m, n} occupies

(r + 1)^{2}

cells in the Padé table, from position (m, n) through position (m+r, n+r), inclusive. In other words, if the same rational function appears more than once in the table, that rational function occupies a square block of cells within the table. This result is known as the block theorem.

If a particular rational function occurs exactly once in the Padé table, it is called a normal approximant to f(z). If every entry in the complete Padé table is normal, the table itself is said to be normal. Normal Padé approximants can be characterized using determinants of the coefficients c_{n} in the Taylor series expansion of f(z), as follows. Define the (m, n)th determinant by

$$D_{m,n} = \left|\begin{matrix}
c_m & c_{m-1} & \ldots & c_{m-n+2} & c_{m-n+1}\\
c_{m+1} & c_m & \ldots & c_{m-n+3} & c_{m-n+2}\\
\vdots & \vdots & & \vdots & \vdots\\
c_{m+n-2} & c_{m+n-3} & \ldots & c_m & c_{m-1}\\
c_{m+n-1} & c_{m+n-2} & \ldots & c_{m+1} & c_m\\
\end{matrix}\right|$$

with D_{m,0} = 1, D_{m,1} = c_{m}, and c_{k} = 0 for k < 0. Then

- the (m, n)th approximant to f(z) is normal if and only if none of the four determinants D_{m,n−1}, D_{m,n}, D_{m+1,n}, and D_{m+1,n+1} vanish; and
- the Padé table is normal if and only if none of the determinants D_{m,n} are equal to zero (note in particular that this means none of the coefficients c_{k} in the series representation of f(z) can be zero).

== Connection with continued fractions ==
One of the most important forms in which an analytic continued fraction can appear is as a regular continued fraction, which is a continued fraction of the form

$$f(z) = b_0 + \cfrac{a_1z}{1 - \cfrac{a_2z}{1 - \cfrac{a_3z}{1 - \cfrac{a_4z}{1 - \ddots}}}}.$$

where the a_{i} ≠ 0 are complex constants, and z is a complex variable.

There is an intimate connection between regular continued fractions and Padé tables with normal approximants along the main diagonal: the "stairstep" sequence of Padé approximants R_{0,0}, R_{1,0}, R_{1,1}, R_{2,1}, R_{2,2}, ... is normal if and only if that sequence coincides with the successive convergents of a regular continued fraction. In other words, if the Padé table is normal along the main diagonal, it can be used to construct a regular continued fraction, and if a regular continued fraction representation for the function f(z) exists, then the main diagonal of the Padé table representing f(z) is normal.

== An example – the exponential function ==
Here is an example of a Padé table, for the exponential function.

A portion of the Padé table for the exponential function e^{z}
n m	0	1	2	3	4
0	$\frac{1}{1}$	$\frac{1}{1 - z}$	$\frac{1}{1 - z + {\scriptstyle\frac{1}{2}}z^2}$	$\frac{1}{1 - z + {\scriptstyle\frac{1}{2}}z^2 - {\scriptstyle\frac{1}{6}}z^3}$	$\frac{1}{1-z+\frac{1}{2}z^{2}-\frac{1}{6}z^{3}+\frac{1}{24}z^{4}}$
1	$\frac{1 + z}{1}$	$\frac{1 + {\scriptstyle\frac{1}{2}}z}{1 - {\scriptstyle\frac{1}{2}}z}$	$\frac{1 + {\scriptstyle\frac{1}{3}}z} {1 - {\scriptstyle\frac{2}{3}}z + {\scriptstyle\frac{1}{6}}z^2}$	$\frac{1 + {\scriptstyle\frac{1}{4}}z} {1 - {\scriptstyle\frac{3}{4}}z + {\scriptstyle\frac{1}{4}}z^2 - {\scriptstyle\frac{1}{24}}z^3}$	$\frac{1+\frac{1}{5}z}{1-\frac{4}{5}z+\frac{3}{10}z^{2}-\frac{1}{15}z^{3}+\frac{1}{120}z^{4}}$
2	$\frac{1 + z + {\scriptstyle\frac{1}{2}}z^2}{1}$	$\frac{1 + {\scriptstyle\frac{2}{3}}z + {\scriptstyle\frac{1}{6}}z^2} {1 - {\scriptstyle\frac{1}{3}}z}$	$\frac{1 + {\scriptstyle\frac{1}{2}}z + {\scriptstyle\frac{1}{12}}z^2} {1 - {\scriptstyle\frac{1}{2}}z + {\scriptstyle\frac{1}{12}}z^2}$	$\frac{1 + {\scriptstyle\frac{2}{5}}z + {\scriptstyle\frac{1}{20}}z^2} {1 - {\scriptstyle\frac{3}{5}}z + {\scriptstyle\frac{3}{20}}z^2 - {\scriptstyle\frac{1}{60}}z^3}$	$\frac{1+\frac{1}{3}z+\frac{1}{30}z^{2}}{1-\frac{2}{3}z+\frac{1}{5}z^{2}-\frac{1}{30}z^{3}+\frac{1}{360}z^{4}}$
3	$\frac{1 + z + {\scriptstyle\frac{1}{2}}z^2 + {\scriptstyle\frac{1}{6}}z^3}{1}$	$\frac{1 + {\scriptstyle\frac{3}{4}}z + {\scriptstyle\frac{1}{4}}z^2 + {\scriptstyle\frac{1}{24}}z^3} {1 - {\scriptstyle\frac{1}{4}}z}$	$\frac{1 + {\scriptstyle\frac{3}{5}}z + {\scriptstyle\frac{3}{20}}z^2 + {\scriptstyle\frac{1}{60}}z^3} {1 - {\scriptstyle\frac{2}{5}}z + {\scriptstyle\frac{1}{20}}z^2}$	$\frac{1 + {\scriptstyle\frac{1}{2}}z + {\scriptstyle\frac{1}{10}}z^2 + {\scriptstyle\frac{1}{120}}z^3} {1 - {\scriptstyle\frac{1}{2}}z + {\scriptstyle\frac{1}{10}}z^2 - {\scriptstyle\frac{1}{120}}z^3}$	$\frac{1+\frac{3}{7}z+\frac{1}{14}z^{2}+\frac{1}{210}z^{3}}{1-\frac{4}{7}z+\frac{1}{7}z^{2}-\frac{2}{105}z^{3}+\frac{1}{840}z^{4}}$
4	$\frac{1 + z + {\scriptstyle\frac{1}{2}}z^2 + {\scriptstyle\frac{1}{6}}z^3+ {\scriptstyle\frac{1}{24}}z^4}{1}$	$\frac{1 + {\scriptstyle\frac{4}{5}}z + {\scriptstyle\frac{3}{10}}z^2 + {\scriptstyle\frac{1}{15}}z^3+ {\scriptstyle\frac{1}{120}}z^4} {1 - {\scriptstyle\frac{1}{5}}z}$	$\frac{1 + {\scriptstyle\frac{2}{3}}z + {\scriptstyle\frac{1}{5}}z^2 + {\scriptstyle\frac{1}{30}}z^3+ {\scriptstyle\frac{1}{360}}z^4} {1 - {\scriptstyle\frac{1}{3}}z + {\scriptstyle\frac{1}{30}}z^2}$	$\frac{1 + {\scriptstyle\frac{4}{7}}z + {\scriptstyle\frac{1}{7}}z^2 + {\scriptstyle\frac{2}{105}}z^3+ {\scriptstyle\frac{1}{840}}z^4} {1 - {\scriptstyle\frac{3}{7}}z + {\scriptstyle\frac{1}{14}}z^2 - {\scriptstyle\frac{1}{210}}z^3}$	$\frac{1+\frac{1}{2}z+\frac{3}{28}z^{2}+\frac{1}{84}z^{3}+\frac{1}{1680}z^{4}}{1-\frac{1}{2}z+\frac{3}{28}z^{2}-\frac{1}{84}z^{3}+\frac{1}{1680}z^{4}}$

Several features are immediately apparent.

- The first column of the table consists of the successive truncations of the Taylor series for e^{z}.
- Similarly, the first row contains the reciprocals of successive truncations of the series expansion of e^{−z}.
- The approximants R_{m,n} and R_{n,m} are quite symmetrical – the numerators and denominators are interchanged, and the patterns of plus and minus signs are different, but the same coefficients appear in both of these approximants. They can be expressed in terms of special functions as

$$R_{m,n}=\frac{{}_1F_1(-m;-m-n;z)}{{}_1F_1(-n;-m-n;-z)} = \frac{n!\,2^m\theta_m\left(\frac{z}{2};n-m+2,2\right)}{m!\,2^n\theta_n\left(-\frac{z}{2};m-n+2,2\right)}$$,

where ${}_1F_1(a;b;z)$ is a generalized hypergeometric series and $\theta_n(x;\alpha,\beta)$ is a generalized reverse Bessel polynomial.
The expressions on the main diagonal reduce to $R_{n,n}=\theta_n(z/2)/\theta_n(-z/2)$, where $\theta_n(x)$ is a reverse Bessel polynomial.

- Computations involving the R_{n,n} (on the main diagonal) can be done quite efficiently. For example, R_{3,3} reproduces the power series for the exponential function perfectly up through ^{1}/_{720} z^{6}, but because of the symmetry of the two cubic polynomials, a very fast evaluation algorithm can be devised.

The procedure used to derive Gauss's continued fraction can be applied to a certain confluent hypergeometric series to derive the following C-fraction expansion for the exponential function, valid throughout the entire complex plane:

$$e^z = 1 + \cfrac{z}{1 - \cfrac{\frac{1}{2}z}{1 + \cfrac{\frac{1}{6}z}{1 - \cfrac{\frac{1}{6}z}
{1 + \cfrac{\frac{1}{10}z}{1 - \cfrac{\frac{1}{10}z}{1 + - \ddots}}}}}}.$$

By applying the fundamental recurrence formulas one may easily verify that the successive convergents of this C-fraction are the stairstep sequence of Padé approximants R_{0,0}, R_{1,0}, R_{1,1}, ... In this particular case a closely related continued fraction can be obtained from the identity

$$e^z = \frac{1}{e^{-z}};$$

that continued fraction looks like this:

$$e^z = \cfrac{1}{1 - \cfrac{z}{1 + \cfrac{\frac{1}{2}z}{1 - \cfrac{\frac{1}{6}z}{1 + \cfrac{\frac{1}{6}z}
{1 - \cfrac{\frac{1}{10}z}{1 + \cfrac{\frac{1}{10}z}{1 - + \ddots}}}}}}}.$$

This fraction's successive convergents also appear in the Padé table, and form the sequence R_{0,0}, R_{0,1}, R_{1,1}, R_{1,2}, R_{2,2}, ...

== Generalizations ==
A formal Newton series L is of the form

$$L(z) = c_0 + \sum_{n=1}^\infty c_n \prod_{k=1}^n (z - \beta_k)$$

where the sequence {β_{k}} of points in the complex plane is known as the set of interpolation points. A sequence of rational approximants R_{m,n} can be formed for such a series L in a manner entirely analogous to the procedure described above, and the approximants can be arranged in a Newton-Padé table. It has been shown that some "staircase" sequences in the Newton-Padé table correspond with the successive convergents of a Thiele-type continued fraction, which is of the form

$$a_0 + \cfrac{a_1(z - \beta_1)}{1 - \cfrac{a_2(z - \beta_2)}{1 - \cfrac{a_3(z - \beta_3)}{1 - \ddots}}}.$$

Mathematicians have also constructed two-point Padé tables by considering two series, one in powers of z, the other in powers of 1/z, which alternately represent the function f(z) in a neighborhood of zero and in a neighborhood of infinity.

== See also ==
- Shanks transformation
