= Peter Wynn (mathematician) =

English mathematician (1931–2017)

- Born: October 1, 1931; Hertford, England
- Died: December 2017 (aged 86); Zacatecas, Mexico
- Education: Johannes Gutenberg-Universität Mainz 1959
- Known for: Epsilon algorithm
- Scientific career
- Fields: Mathematician
- Workplaces: Mathematisch Centrum Amsterdam, University of Wisconsin-Madison, Université de Montréal, McGill University
- Doctoral advisor: Friedrich L. Bauer

Peter Wynn (1931—2017) was an English mathematician. His main achievements concern approximation theory – in particular the theory of Padé approximants – and its application in numerical methods for improving the rate of convergence of sequences of real numbers.

== Publications ==
1. Wynn, P. (1956). "A note on Salzer's method for summing certain convergent series". J. Math. Phys. 35: 318–320. doi:10.1002/sapm1956351318. MR 0086910.
2. Wynn, Peter (1956). "On a procrustean technique for the numerical transformation of slowly convergent sequences and series". Mathematical Proceedings of the Cambridge Philosophical Society. 52 (4): 663–671. Bibcode:1956PCPS...52..663W. doi:10.1017/S030500410003173X. MR 0081979. S2CID 123285425.
3. Wynn, Peter (1956). "On a device for computing the e_{m}(S_{n}) transformation". Mathematical Tables and Other Aids to Computation. 10 (54): 91–96. doi:10.2307/2002183. JSTOR 2002183. MR 0084056.
4. Wynn, P. (1956). "On a cubically convergent process for determining the zeros of certain functions". Mathematical Tables and Other Aids to Computation. 10 (54): 97–100. doi:10.1090/s0025-5718-1956-0081547-9. MR 0081547.
5. Wynn, P. (1956). "Central difference and other forms of the Euler transformation". The Quarterly Journal of Mechanics and Applied Mathematics. 9 (2): 249–256. doi:10.1093/qjmam/9.2.249. MR 0080782.
6. Wynn, Peter (1959). "On the propagation of error in certain non-linear algorithms". Numerische Mathematik. 1 (1): 142–149. doi:10.1007/BF01386380. MR 0107988. S2CID 122078822.
7. Wynn, Peter (1959). "A sufficient condition for the instability of the q-d algorithm". Numerische Mathematik. 1 (1): 203–207. doi:10.1007/BF01386385. MR 0109426. S2CID 119934500.
8. Wynn, P. (1959). "Converging factors for continued fractions". Numerische Mathematik. 1: 272–320. doi:10.1007/BF01386385. MR 0116158. S2CID 119934500.
9. Wynn, Peter (1960). "Über einen Interpolations-algorithmus und gewisse andere Formeln, die in der Theorie der Interpolation durch rationale Funktionen bestehen". Numerische Mathematik. 2: 151–182. doi:10.1007/BF01386220. MR 0128597. S2CID 123016266.
10. Wynn, Peter (1960). "On the rational approximation of functions which are formally defined by a power series expansion". Mathematical Tables and Other Aids to Computation. 14 (70): 147–186. doi:10.2307/2003209. JSTOR 2003209. MR 0116457.
11. Wynn, Peter (1960). "Confluent forms of certain non-linear algorithms". Archiv der Mathematik. 11: 233–236. doi:10.1007/BF01236936. MR 0128068. S2CID 119969464.
12. Wynn, Peter (1960). "A note on a confluent form of the ε-algorithm". Archiv der Mathematik. 11 (1): 237. doi:10.1007/BF01236937. MR 0128069. S2CID 120767619.
13. Wynn, Peter (1961). "On the tabulation of indefinite integrals". BIT. Nordisk Tidskift for Information-behandling. 1 (4): 286–290. doi:10.1007/BF01933245. S2CID 119660534.
14. Wynn, Peter (1961). "L'ε-algorithmo e la tavola di Padé". Rend. Di Mat. Roma. 20: 403. MR 0158206.
15. Wynn, Peter (1961). "The epsilon algorithm and operational formulas of numerical analysis". Mathematics of Computation. 15 (74): 151–158. doi:10.2307/2004221. JSTOR 2004221. MR 0158513. Archived from the original on 2011-07-18.
16. Wynn, Peter (1961). "On repeated application of the epsilon algorithm". Chiffres. 4: 19–22. MR 0149145. Archived from the original on 2011-07-18.
17. Wynn, Peter (1961). "The numerical transformation of slowly convergent series by methods of comparison". Chiffres. 4: 177–210. MR 0162350.
18. Wynn, Peter (1961). "A sufficient condition for the instability of the ε-algorithm". Nieuw Arch. Wiskunde. 9 (3): 117–119. MR 0139252.
19. Wynn, Peter (1962). "A note on a method of Bradshaw for transforming slowly convergent series and continued fractions". American Mathematical Monthly. 69 (9): 883–889. doi:10.2307/2311237. JSTOR 2311237. MR 0146559.
20. Wynn, Peter (1962). "Upon a second confluent form the ε-algorithm". Proceedings of the Glasgow Mathematical Association. 5: 160–165. doi:10.1017/S2040618500034535. MR 0139253.
21. Wynn, Peter (1962). "Acceleration techniques for iterated vector and matrix problems". Mathematics of Computation. 16 (79): 301–322. doi:10.2307/2004051. JSTOR 2004051. MR 0145647.
22. Wynn, Peter (1962). "A comparison technique for the numerical transformation of slowly convergent series based on the use of rational functions". Numerische Mathematik. 4 (1): 8–14. doi:10.1007/BF01386291. MR 0136500. S2CID 122442672.
23. Wynn, Peter (1962). "Note on the solution of a certain boundary-value problem". BIT. 2 (1): 61–64. doi:10.1007/BF02024783. MR 0155445. S2CID 121863164.
24. Wynn, Peter (1962). "An arsenal of ALGOL procedures for complex arithmetic". BIT. 2 (4): 232–255. doi:10.1007/BF01940171. MR 0166945. S2CID 60076831.
25. Wynn, Peter (1962). "The numerical transformation of slowly convergent series by methods of comparison. II". Chiffres. 5: 65–88. MR 0149146.
26. Wynn, Peter (1963). "Singular rules for certain non-linear algorithms" (PDF). BIT. 3 (3): 175–195. doi:10.1007/BF01939985. S2CID 120390887. Archived from the original (PDF) on 2011-07-18.
27. Wynn, Peter (1963). "Note on a converging factor for a certain continued fraction". Numerische Mathematik. 5 (1): 332–352. doi:10.1007/BF01385901. S2CID 118433217.
28. Wynn, Peter (1963). "Continued fractions whose coefficients obey a non-commutative law of multiplication". Archive for Rational Mechanics and Analysis. 12 (1): 273–312. Bibcode:1963ArRMA..12..273W. doi:10.1007/BF00281229. S2CID 119950069.
29. Wynn, Peter (1964). "Partial differential equations associated with certain non-linear algorithms". Zeitschrift für Angewandte Mathematik und Physik. 15 (3): 273–289. Bibcode:1964ZaMP...15..273W. doi:10.1007/BF01607018. S2CID 121579702.
30. Wynn, Peter (1964). "General purpose vector-algorithm algol procedures". Numerische Mathematik. 6 (1): 22–36. doi:10.1007/BF01386050. S2CID 123954363. Archived from the original on 2011-07-18.
31. Wynn, Peter (1964). "On some recent developments in the theory and application of continued fractions". Journal of the Society for Industrial and Applied Mathematics, Series B: Numerical Analysis. 1 (1): 177–197. Bibcode:1964SJNA....1..177W. doi:10.1137/0701015. JSTOR 2949774.
32. Wynn, Peter (1965). "A note on programming repeated application of the epsilon-algorithm". Chiffres. 8: 23–62. MR 0181081.
33. Wynn, Peter (1966). "Upon systems of recursions which obtain among the quotients of the Padé table". Numerische Mathematik. 8 (3): 264–269. doi:10.1007/BF02162562. S2CID 123789548.
34. Wynn, Peter (1966). "On the convergence and stability of the epsilon algorithm". SIAM Journal on Numerical Analysis. 3 (1): 91–122. Bibcode:1966SJNA....3...91W. doi:10.1137/0703007.
35. Wynn, Peter (1966). "On the computation of certain functions of large argument and parameter". BIT. 6 (3): 228–259. doi:10.1007/BF01934356. S2CID 122412699.
36. Wynn, Peter (1967). "A general system of orthogonal polynomials". The Quarterly Journal of Mathematics. 18 (1): 81–96. Bibcode:1967QJMat..18...81W. doi:10.1093/qmath/18.1.81.
37. Wynn, Peter (1968). "Upon the Padé table derived from a Stieltjes series". SIAM Journal on Numerical Analysis. 5 (4): 805–834. Bibcode:1968SJNA....5..805W. doi:10.1137/0705060. JSTOR 2949427.
38. Wynn, Peter (1968). "Vector continued fractions". Linear Algebra and Its Applications. 1 (3): 357–395. doi:10.1016/0024-3795(68)90015-3.
39. Wynn, Peter (1969). "Zur Theorie der mit gewissen speziellen Funktionen verknüpften Padéschen Tafeln". Mathematische Zeitschrift. 109 (1): 66–77. doi:10.1007/BF01135574. S2CID 121190788.
40. Wynn, Peter (1971). "A note on the generalised Euler transformation". The Computer Journal. 14 (4): 437–441. doi:10.1093/comjnl/14.4.437.
41. Wynn, Peter (1971). "A transformation of series". Calcolo. 8 (3): 255–272. doi:10.1007/BF02575517. S2CID 120203819.
42. Wynn, Peter (1971). "Difference-differential recursions for Padé quotients". Proceedings of the London Mathematical Society. s3-23 (2): 283–300. doi:10.1112/plms/s3-23.2.283.
43. Wynn, Peter (1972). "Convergence acceleration by a method of intercalation". Computing. 9 (4): 267–273. doi:10.1007/BF02241602. S2CID 44050165.
44. Wynn, Peter (1972). "Invariants associated with the epsilon algorithm and its first confluent form". Rendiconti del Circolo Matematico di Palermo. 21 (1–2): 31–41. doi:10.1007/BF02844229. S2CID 123537335.
45. Wynn, Peter (1973). "Upon some continuous prediction algorithms. II". Calcolo. 9 (4): 235–278. doi:10.1007/BF02575582. S2CID 121617962.
46. Wynn, Peter (1974). "Some recent developments in the theories of continued fractions and the Padé table". Rocky Mountain Journal of Mathematics. 4 (2): 297–324. doi:10.1216/RMJ-1974-4-2-297.
47. Wynn, Peter (1976). "The algebra of certain formal power series". Rivista di Matematica della Università di Parma. 2 (4): 155–176. MR 0447220.
48. Wynn, Peter (1976). "A convergence theory of some methods of integration". J. Reine Angew. Math. 1976 (285): 181–208. doi:10.1515/crll.1976.285.181. MR 0415119. S2CID 116034573.
49. Wynn, Peter (1977). "The calculus of finite differences over certain systems of numbers". Calcolo. 14 (4): 303–341. doi:10.1007/BF02575990. MR 0503568. S2CID 120710345.
50. Wynn, Peter (1981). "The convergence of approximating fractions". Bol. Soc. Mat. Mexicana. 26 (2): 57–71. MR 0742016.
51. Wynn, Peter (1981). "The work of E. B. Christoffel on the theory of continued fractions". In Butzer, P. L.; Fehér, F (eds.). E. B. Christoffel: The Influence of His Work on Mathematics and the Physical Sciences. Birkhäuser Verlag. ISBN 3-7643-1162-2. MR 0661065.

MathSciNet entries

== Reference books ==
- C. Brezinski and M. Redivo-Zaglia: "The genesis and early developments of Aitken’s process, Shanks' transformation, the epsilon algorithm, and related fixed point methods", Numer. Algorithms, vol.80 (2019) pp.11-133.
- C. Brezinski: "Reminiscences of Peter Wynn", Numer. Algorithms, vol.80 (2019) pp.5–11.
- C. Brezinski and M. Redivo-Zaglia: ”Extrapolation and rational interpolation, the works of the main contributors”, Springer, 2020.
