= Francis Jacobs =

British jurist (born 1939)

The Right Honourable Sir Francis Jacobs KCMG KC
- Royal coat of arms of the United Kingdom

Advocate General at the European Court of Justice
- In office 1988–2006
- Preceded by: The Lord Slynn of Hadley
- Succeeded by: Dame Eleanor Sharpston

Personal details
- Born: Francis Geoffrey Jacobs; 8 June 1939 (age 87)
- Children: 5
- Education: Nuffield College, Oxford
- Occupation: Judge
- Profession: Barrister

Sir Francis Geoffrey Jacobs KCMG KC (born 8 June 1939) is a British jurist who served as Advocate General at the Court of Justice of the European Communities from October 1988 to January 2006. He was educated at the City of London School, and Christ Church, Oxford, where he read Mods and Greats (Classics), and Nuffield College, Oxford, where he read for a DPhil in Law. He practised as a barrister from Fountain Court Chambers in London. Jacobs has served as an official with the Secretariat of the European Commission of Human Rights, Professor of European Law at the University of London and Director of the Centre of European Law for King's College London School of Law. He is visiting professor at the College of Europe. He was appointed a Privy Councillor in December 2005.

On 4 December 2007, Jacobs was elected President of Missing Children Europe, the European Federation for Missing and Sexually Exploited Children.

He was President of the European Law Institute from 2011 to 2013.

He married in 1975 (as his second wife) Susan Cox, granddaughter of Michael Gordon Clark; they have three daughters and one son. He has one son by an earlier marriage.

== See also ==
- List of members of the European Court of Justice

== List of cases ==
- Case C-251/95 Sabel BV v Puma AG, Rudolf Dassler Sport [1997] ECR I-6214
- Case C-412/93 Leclerc-Siplec [1995] ECR I-00179
- Case C-34-36/95 De Agostini [1997] ECR I-3843
- Case C-409/95 Marschall v Land Nordrhein Westfalen [1997] ECR I-06363
- Case C-405/98 Gourmet International [2001] ECR I-1795
- Case C-50/00 Unión de Pequeños Agricultores (UPA) [2002] ECR I-6677
- Case C-153/02 Valentina Neri [2003] ECR I-13572
- Case C-147/03 Commission v Austria [2005] ECR I-5992
- Case C-421/04 Matratzen Concord AG v Hukla Germany SA [2006] ECR I-2322
