= Unión de Pequeños Agricultores =

Unión de Pequeños Agricultores v Council
- Court: European Court of Justice
- Citations: (2002) C-50/00 P, [2002] ECR I-6677

Keywords
- Judicial review

Unión de Pequeños Agricultores v Council of the European Union (2002) C-50/00 P is an EU law case, concerning a judicial review of a regulation adopted by the European Union. In this case, the European Court of Justice declined to accept the preliminary opinion of the Advocate General, Francis Jacobs.

== Facts ==
The Unión de Pequeños Agricultores (UPA), representing small Spanish agricultural businesses, challenged Council Regulation 1638/98, which withdrew subsidies from olive oil producers. UPA admitted the measure was a true regulation, and the applicants lacked individual concern, but argued that because it did not require implementation at national level, there was no way to challenge the action before national courts, and it would be denied effective judicial protection unless it could bring a direct action. The Court of First Instance had held that UPA had no locus standi under TEC art 230(4) (now TFEU art 263(4)).

== Opinion of Advocate General Jacobs ==
AG Jacobs' Opinion said the court's existing case law was incompatible with effective judicial protection. Non-privileged applicants should be regarded as individually concerned when a measure was liable to have substantial adverse effects on his or her interests. He argued the law should be liberalised because (1) the preliminary ruling procedure gave no right for individuals to make a reference, and therefore had no right of access to the CJ (2) only allowing standing when there is no national law way to trigger a preliminary ruling is not enough (3) there could be, as here, an absence of remedy as of right when national law fails to contain any (4) so the solution is to recognise standing where a measure has 'a substantial adverse effect on his interests' (5) objections to enlarge standing are flawed – there is nothing against it in the treaties (6) the settled case law is ripe for change, especially since member states have liberalised Judicial Review themselves.

== Court of Justice ==
The Court of Justice, rejecting Jacobs' opinion, upheld Plaumann & Co v Commission, but accepted the individuals should have redress. This could be achieved through national courts. If that was not possible, it would be the member state's fault. UPA should have standing for a direct action whenever a remedy did not exist in national law, because the CJ would have to rule on national law rules when it had no such jurisdiction.

35 Thus, under Article 173 of the Treaty, a regulation, as a measure of general application, cannot be challenged by natural or legal persons other than the institutions, the European Central Bank and the Member States (see, to that effect, Case 92/78 Simmenthal v Commission [1979] ECR 777, paragraph 40).

36 However, a measure of general application such as a regulation can, in certain circumstances, be of individual concern to certain natural or legal persons and is thus in the nature of a decision in their regard.... That is so where the measure in question affects specific natural or legal persons by reason of certain attributes peculiar to them, or by reason of a factual situation which differentiates them from all other persons and distinguishes them individually in the same way as the addressee (see, in particular, Case 25/62 Plaumann & Co v Commission [1963] ECR 95, 107, and Case C-452/98 Nederlandse Antillen v Council [2001] ECR I-8973, paragraph 60).

37 If that condition is not fulfilled, a natural or legal person does not, under any circumstances, have standing to bring an action for annulment of a regulation (see, in that regard, the order in CNPAAP v Council, cited above, paragraph 38).

38 The European Community is, however, a community based on the rule of law in which its institutions are subject to judicial review of the compatibility of their acts with the Treaty and with the general principles of law which include fundamental rights.

39 Individuals are therefore entitled to effective judicial protection of the rights they derive from the Community legal order, and the right to such protection is one of the general principles of law stemming from the constitutional traditions common to the Member States. That right has also been enshrined in Articles 6 and 13 of the European Convention for the Protection of Human Rights and Fundamental Freedoms (see, in particular, Case 222/84 Johnston v Chief Constable of the Royal Ulster Constabulary [1986] ECR 1651, paragraph 18, and Case C-424/99 Commission v Austria [2001] ECR I-9285, paragraph 45).

40 By Article 173 and Article 184 (now Article 241 EC), on the one hand, and by Article 177, on the other, the Treaty has established a complete system of legal remedies and procedures designed to ensure judicial review of the legality of acts of the institutions, and has entrusted such review to the Community Courts (see, to that effect, Les Verts v Parliament, paragraph 23). Under that system, where natural or legal persons cannot, by reason of the conditions for admissibility laid down in the fourth paragraph of Article 173 of the Treaty, directly challenge Community measures of general application, they are able, depending on the case, either indirectly to plead the invalidity of such acts before the Community Courts under Article 184 of the Treaty or to do so before the national courts and ask them, since they have no jurisdiction themselves to declare those measures invalid (see Case 314/85 Foto-Frost v Hauptzollamt Lübeck-Ost [1987] ECR 4199, paragraph 20), to make a reference to the Court of Justice for a preliminary ruling on validity.

41 Thus it is for the Member States to establish a system of legal remedies and procedures which ensure respect for the right to effective judicial protection.

42 in that context, in accordance with the principle of sincere cooperation laid down in Article 5 of the Treaty, national courts are required, so far as possible, to interpret and apply national procedural rules governing the exercise of rights of action in a way that enables natural and legal persons to challenge before the courts the legality of any decision or other national measure relative to the application to them of a Community act of general application, by pleading the invalidity of such an act.

43 As the Advocate General has pointed out in paragraphs 50 to 53 of his Opinion, it is not acceptable to adopt an interpretation of the system of remedies, such as that favoured by the appellant, to the effect that a direct action for annulment before the Community Court will be available where it can be shown, following an examination by that Court of the particular national procedural rules, that those rules do not allow the individual to bring proceedings to contest the validity of the Community measure at issue. Such an interpretation would require the Community Court, in each individual case, to examine and interpret national procedural law. That would go beyond its jurisdiction when reviewing the legality of Community measures.

44 Finally, it should be added that, according to the system for judicial review of legality established by the Treaty, a natural or legal person can bring an action challenging a regulation only if it is concerned both directly and individually. Although this last condition must be interpreted in the light of the principle of effective judicial protection by taking account of the various circumstances that may distinguish an applicant individually (see, for example, Joined Cases 67/85, 68/85 and 70/85 Van der Kooy v Commission [1988] ECR 219, paragraph 14; Extramet Industrie v Council, paragraph 13, and Codorniu v Council, paragraph 19), such an interpretation cannot have the effect of setting aside the condition in question, expressly laid down in the Treaty, without going beyond the jurisdiction conferred by the Treaty on the Community Courts.

45 While it is, admittedly, possible to envisage a system of judicial review of the legality of Community measures of general application different from that established by the founding Treaty and never amended as to its principles, it is for the Member States, if necessary, in accordance with Article 48 EU, to reform the system currently in force.

46 in the light of the foregoing, the Court finds that the Court of First Instance did not err in law when it declared the appellant's application inadmissible without examining whether, in the particular case, there was a remedy before a national court enabling the validity of the contested regulation to be examined.

47 The appeal must therefore be dismissed.

== See also ==
- European Union law
