= Henri Padé =

French mathematician (1863–1953)

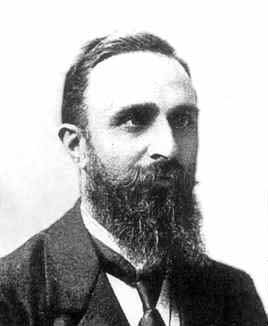
- Born: 17 December 1863; Abbeville, Somme, France
- Died: 9 July 1953 (aged 89); Aix-en-Provence, France
- Education: École Normale Supérieure
- Known for: Padé approximant Padé table
- Awards: ICM Speaker (1900)
- Scientific career
- Fields: Mathematics
- Thesis: Sur la representation approchee d'une fonction par des fractions rationelles
- Doctoral advisor: Charles Hermite

Henri Eugène Padé (French: [pade]; 17 December 1863 – 9 July 1953) was a French mathematician, who is now remembered mainly for his development of Padé approximation techniques for functions using rational functions.

== Education and career ==
Padé studied at École Normale Supérieure in Paris. He then spent a year at Leipzig University and the University of Göttingen, where he studied under Felix Klein and Hermann Schwarz.

In 1890 Padé returned to France, where he taught in Lille while preparing his doctorate under Charles Hermite. His doctoral thesis described what is now known as the Padé approximant. He then became an assistant professor at Université Lille Nord de France, where he succeeded Émile Borel as a professor of rational mechanics at École Centrale de Lille.

Padé taught at Lille until 1902, when he moved to Université de Poitiers. He became recteur of Académie de Besançon and Dijon in 1923. He later became Recteur of Académie de Aix-Marseilles until he retired in 1934.
