= Commission v Austria =

EU law case

- European Court of Justice

Decided 7 July 2005
- Full case name: Commission of the European Communities v Republic of Austria.
- Case: C-147/03
- ECLI: ECLI:EU:C:2005:427
- Case type: Failure of a Member State to fulfil obligations

Ruling
- Declares that, by failing to take the necessary measures to ensure that holders of secondary education diplomas awarded in other Member States can gain access to higher and university education organised by it under the same conditions as holders of secondary education diplomas awarded in Austria, the Republic of Austria has failed to fulfil its obligations under Articles 12 EC, 149 EC and 150 EC.

Court composition
- Judge Rapporteur; Jerzy Makarczyk
- Advocate General; Francis Geoffrey Jacobs

Keywords
- Free movement of citizens

Commission v Austria (2005) C-147/03 is a decision of the European Court of Justice, concerning the prohibition of discrimination on the ground of nationality, to protect European Union citizens. In particular, the case concerned the failure of Austria to avoid the discrimination of holders of secondary education diplomas, awarded in other Member States, when trying to gain access to higher and university education in Austria.

== Facts ==
Austria gave access to higher education for holders of Austrian school certificates, but had higher requirements for non-Austrians. Austria said it sought to preserve the ‘homogeneity of the Austrian higher or university education system.’ It could otherwise expect many German or Italian students to attempt to enter Austria, causing ‘structural, staffing and financial problems’ (relying on Kohll (1998) C-158/96).

EU law at the time provided for a general prohibition of discrimination on grounds of nationality (Article 12 of the Treaty of Rome). In addition to this prohibition, EU law also imposed certain obligations on the member states concerning education and training (Articles 149 and 150).

On 9 November 1999, the Commission decided to send a letter of formal notice to Austria, claiming that it had infringed the three provisions. Since it was not satisfied by the replies, the Commission sent Austria a reasoned opinion asking to take measures. Eventually, on 31 March 2003, the Commission brought the action under Article 226 EC for failure to fulfil obligations, as it was not satisfied by the Austrian Government's reply.

== Judgment ==
The Court of Justice held that there was little evidence of an actual problem, and a justification based on preserving Austrian homogeneity was not valid. If there was excessive demand for courses, non-discriminatory measures such as an entry exam or minimum grade would suffice. According to the Court, the problems ‘have been and are suffered by other Member States’.

This reasoning of the Court followed that of the Opinion of the Advocate General, Francis Jacobs.

== See also ==
- European Union law
- Court of Justice of the European Union
