= Silvia Clemente =

Spanish politician

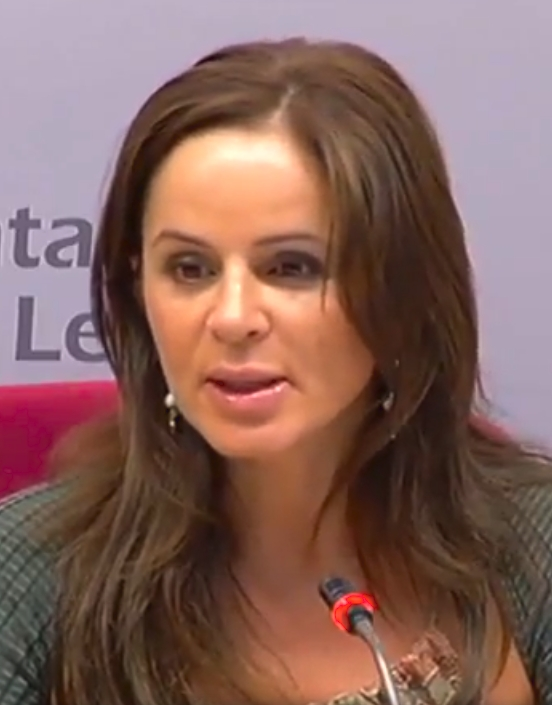
- Silvia Clemente in 2013

Minister for the Environment of the Junta of Castile and León
- In office 22 March 2001 – 4 July 2003
- President: Juan Vicente Herrera
- Preceded by: José Manuel Fernández Santiago
- Succeeded by: María Jesús Ruiz

Deputy in the Cortes of Castile and León for Segovia
- In office 17 June 2003 – 21 February 2019

Minister of Culture and Tourism of the Junta of Castile and León
- In office 4 July 2003 – 3 July 2007
- President: Juan Vicente Herrera
- Preceded by: María Jesús Ruiz
- Succeeded by: María José Salgueiro

Minister of Agriculture and Livestock of the Junta of Castile and León
- In office 3 July 2007 – 8 July 2015
- President: Juan Vicente Herrera
- Preceded by: José Valín
- Succeeded by: Milagros Marcos

President of the Cortes of Castile and León
- In office 16 June 2015 – 12 March 2019
- Preceded by: Josefa García
- Succeeded by: Ángel Ibáñez Hernando

Personal details
- Born: Silvia Clemente Municio; 6 September 1967 (age 58) La Velilla, Spain
- Party: People's Party
- Education: University of Madrid
- Occupation: Politician civil servant

Silvia Clemente Municio (born 6 September 1967) is a Spanish politician and civil servant.

== Biography ==
Silvia Clemente was born in La Velilla. She earned a law degree from University of Madrid. She began her activity in the territorial service for agriculture and livestock in Segovia. She changed her obligation in 2003, when she was appointed culture and tourism advisor. She was appointed environment minister. She was ‍also deputy in the Cortes of Castile and León for Segovia.
