= Michela Redivo-Zaglia =

Italian numerical analyst

Michela Redivo-Zaglia is an Italian numerical analyst known for her works on numerical linear algebra and on extrapolation-based acceleration of numerical methods. She is an associate professor in the department of mathematics at the University of Padua.

== Education and career ==
Redivo-Zaglia earned a degree in mathematics at the University of Padua in 1975, and completed her Ph.D. in 1992 at the University of Lille in France. Her dissertation, Extrapolation, Méthodes de Lanczos et Polynômes Orthogonaux: Théorie et Conception de Logiciels was supervised by Claude Brezinski.

She worked at the University of Padua, in the department of electronics and computer science, from 1984 to 1998, when she became an associate professor in 1998 at the University of Calabria. She subsequently returned to Padua as an associate professor.

== Books ==
Redivo-Zaglia's books include:

- Extrapolation Methods: Theory and Practice (with Claude Brezinski, North-Holland, 1991)
- Méthodes Numériques Directes de l’Algèbre Matricielle (Direct Numerical Methods for Matrix Algebra, with Claude Brezinski, Ellipses, 2004)
- Méthodes Numériques Itératives: Algèbre Linéaire et Non Linéaire (Iterative Numerical Methods: Linear and Nonlinear Algebra, with Claude Brezinski, Ellipses, 2006)
- Extrapolation and Rational Approximation: The Works of the Main Contributors (with Claude Brezinski, Springer, 2020)
- The Birth and Early Developments of Orthogonal Polynomials: A Chronological History (with Claude Brezinski, SIAM, 2026)

She is also the author of four textbooks on computer science and numerical analysis in Italian.

== Recognition ==
In 2019, a workshop on numerical analysis was held at the University of Porto, dedicated to Redivo-Zaglia and her advisor Claude Brezinski, "due to their important contributions to this field of research".
