= Archiv der Mathematik =

- Discipline: Mathematics
- Language: English
- Edited by: Ralph Chill and Gabriele Nebe

Publication details
- History: 1948–present
- Publisher: Springer
- Frequency: Monthly
- Open access: Hybrid
- Impact factor: 0.608 (2020)

Standard abbreviations
- ISO 4: Arch. Math. (Basel)

Indexing
- CODEN: ACVMAL
- ISSN: 0003-889X (print); 1420-8938 (web)
- LCCN: 51030668
- OCLC no.: 01481903

Links
- Journal homepage

Archiv der Mathematik is a peer-reviewed mathematics journal published by Springer, established in 1948.

== Abstracting and indexing ==
The journal is abstracted and indexed in:

- Mathematical Reviews
- Zentralblatt MATH
- Scopus
- SCImago

According to the Journal Citation Reports, the journal has a 2020 impact factor of 0.608.
