= Fresno el Viejo =

Coordinates: 41°11′46″N 5°08′43″W

Fresno el Viejo, Spain
- Flag Coat of arms

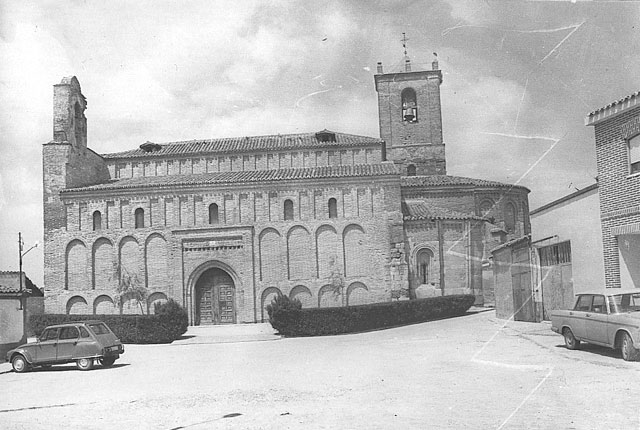
- Country: Spain
- Autonomous community: Castile and León
- Province: Valladolid
- Municipality: Fresno el Viejo

Area
  - Total: 64 km^{2} (25 sq mi)
- Elevation: 759 m (2,490 ft)

Population (2025-01-01)
  - Total: 825
  - Density: 13/km^{2} (33/sq mi)
- Time zone: UTC+1 (CET)
  - Summer (DST): UTC+2 (CEST)

Fresno el Viejo is a municipality located in the province of Valladolid, Castile and León, Spain. According to the 2017 census (INE), the municipality has a population of 927 inhabitants.

Once a center of furniture manufacture, Fresno's economy now centers on agriculture. It has a notable Mudéjar church, Iglesia de San Juan Bautista, pictured on the right.

== See also ==
- Cuisine of the province of Valladolid
