= Extrapolation domain analysis =

Ecosystem management approach

Extrapolation domain analysis (EDA) is a methodology for identifying geographical areas that seem suitable for adoption of innovative ecosystem management practices on the basis of sites exhibiting similarity in conditions such as climatic, land use and socioeconomic indicators. Whilst it has been applied to water research projects in nine pilot basins, the concept is generic and can be applied to any project where accelerating change being considered as a central development objective.

The outputs of the method thus far have been used to quantify the global economic impact of implementing particular innovations together with its effect on water resources. The research has stimulated members of several of the Challenge Program for Water and Food projects to explore potential areas for scaling out. Such is the case of the Quesungual agroforestry system in Honduras, which is moving towards new areas in parallel with areas identified by the EDA method.

EDA is a combined approach that incorporates a number of spatial analysis techniques. It was first investigated in 2006, when it was applied to assess how similarity analysis can be used to scale out research findings within seven Andes pilot systems of basins. The method developed further the research around Jones' 'Homologue' analysis by incorporating socio-economic variables in the search for similar sites around the Tropics. It has since been used to evaluate ‘Impact pathways’ and Global Impact Analysis. 'Homologue' was developed to determine the similarity of climatic conditions across a geographical area to those exhibited by the pilot site; the pixel resolution at which this is processed is 2.43 arc minutes, or 4.5 km at the equator.

To derive the extrapolation domains, Bayesian and frequentist statistical modelling techniques are used. The weights-of-evidence (WofE) methodology is applied; this is based largely on the concepts of Bayesian probabilistic reasoning. In essence, statistical inference is based on determining the probability of target sites adopting the change demonstrated in pilot areas. The assumption is that a collection of training points will, in aggregate, have common characteristics that will allow their presence in other similar sites to be predicted. It is based on the collection of factors (used to create evidential theme data layers) that prove to be consistent with successful implementation at pilot sites and assumes that if target sites exhibit similar socio-economic, together with climatic and landscapes attributes to pilot sites, then there is strong evidence to suggest that out-scaling to these sites will succeed.
