= Euler summation =

Summation method for some divergent series

In the mathematics of convergent and divergent series, Euler summation is a summation method. That is, it is a method for assigning a value to a series, different from the conventional method of taking limits of partial sums. Given a series Σa_{n}, if its Euler transform converges to a sum, then that sum is called the Euler sum of the original series. As well as being used to define values for divergent series, Euler summation can be used to speed the convergence of series.

Euler summation can be generalized into a family of methods denoted (E, q), where q ≥ 0. The (E, 1) sum is the ordinary Euler sum. All of these methods are strictly weaker than Borel summation; for q > 0 they are incomparable with Abel summation.

== Definition ==
For some value y we may define the Euler sum (if it converges for that value of y) corresponding to a particular formal summation as:

$$_{E_y}\, \sum_{j=0}^\infty  a_j := \sum_{i=0}^\infty \frac{1}{(1+y)^{i+1}} \sum_{j=0}^i \binom{i}{j} y^{j+1} a_j .$$

If all the formal sums actually converge, the Euler sum will equal the left hand side. However, using Euler summation can accelerate the convergence (this is especially useful for alternating series); sometimes it can also give a useful meaning to divergent sums.

To justify the approach notice that for interchanged sum, Euler's summation reduces to the initial series, because

$$y^{j+1}\sum_{i=j}^\infty \binom{i}{j} \frac{1}{(1+y)^{i+1}}=1.$$

This method itself cannot be improved by iterated application, as

$$_{E_{y_1}} {}_{E_{y_2}}\sum = \, _{E_{\frac{y_1 y_2}{1+y_1+y_2}}} \sum.$$

== Examples ==
- Using y = 1 for the formal sum $\sum_{j=0}^\infty (-1)^j P_k(j)$ we get $\sum_{i=0}^k \frac{1}{2^{i+1}} \sum_{j=0}^i \binom{i}{j} (-1)^j P_k(j),$ if P_{k} is a polynomial of degree k. Note that the inner sum would be zero for i > k, so in this case Euler summation reduces an infinite series to a finite sum.
- The particular choice $P_k(j):= (j+1)^k$ provides an explicit representation of the Bernoulli numbers, since $\frac{B_{k+1}}{k+1}=-\zeta(-k)$ (the Riemann zeta function). Indeed, the formal sum in this case diverges since k is positive, but applying Euler summation to the zeta function (or rather, to the related Dirichlet eta function) yields (cf. Globally convergent series) $\frac{1}{1-2^{k+1}}\sum_{i=0}^k \frac{1}{2^{i+1}} \sum_{j=0}^i \binom{i}{j} (-1)^j (j+1)^k$ which is of closed form.
- $\sum_{j=0}^\infty z^j= \sum_{i=0}^\infty \frac{1}{(1+y)^{i+1}} \sum_{j=0}^i \binom{i}{j} y^{j+1} z^j = \frac{y}{1+y} \sum_{i=0}^\infty \left( \frac{1+yz}{1+y} \right)^i$

With an appropriate choice of y (i.e. equal to or close to −1/z) this series converges to 1/(1 − z).

== See also ==
- Binomial transform
- Borel summation
- Cesàro summation
- Lambert summation
- Perron's formula
- Abelian and Tauberian theorems
- Abel–Plana formula
- Abel's summation formula
- Van Wijngaarden transformation
- Euler–Boole summation
