= Sequence transformation =

Mathematical operator acting on sequences

In mathematics, a sequence transformation is an operator acting on a given space of sequences (a sequence space). Sequence transformations include linear mappings such as discrete convolution with another sequence and resummation of a sequence and nonlinear mappings, more generally. They are commonly used for series acceleration, that is, for improving the rate of convergence of a slowly convergent sequence or series. Sequence transformations are also commonly used to compute the antilimit of a divergent series numerically, and are used in conjunction with extrapolation methods.

Classical examples for sequence transformations include the binomial transform, Möbius transform, and Stirling transform.

== Definitions ==
For a given sequence

$$(s_n)_{n\in\N},\,$$

and a sequence transformation $\mathbf{T},$ the sequence resulting from transformation by $\mathbf{T}$ is

$$\mathbf{T}( ( s_n ) ) = ( s'_n )_{n\in\N},$$

where the elements of the transformed sequence are usually computed from some finite number of members of the original sequence, for instance

$$s_n' = T_n(s_n,s_{n+1},\dots,s_{n+k_n})$$

for some natural number $k_n$ for each $n$ and a multivariate function $T_n$ of $k_n + 1$ variables for each $n.$ See for instance the binomial transform and Aitken's delta-squared process. In the simplest case the elements of the sequences, the $s_n$ and $s'_n$, are real or complex numbers. More generally, they may be elements of some vector space or algebra.

If the multivariate functions $T_n$ are linear in each of their arguments for each value of $n,$ for instance if

$$s'_n=\sum_{m=0}^{k_n} c_{n,m} s_{n+m}$$

for some constants $k_n$ and $c_{n,0},\dots,c_{n,k_n}$ for each $n,$ then the sequence transformation $\mathbf{T}$ is called a linear sequence transformation. Sequence transformations that are not linear are called nonlinear sequence transformations.

In the context of series acceleration, when the original sequence $(s_n)$ and the transformed sequence $(s'_n)$ share the same limit $\ell$ as $n \rightarrow \infty,$ the transformed sequence is said to have a faster rate of convergence than the original sequence if

$$\lim_{n\to\infty} \frac{s'_n-\ell}{s_n-\ell} = 0.$$

If the original sequence is divergent, the sequence transformation may act as an extrapolation method to an antilimit $\ell$.

== Examples ==
The simplest examples of sequence transformations include shifting all elements by an integer $k$ that does not depend on $n,$ $s'_n = s_{n+k}$ if $n + k \geq 0$ and 0 otherwise, and scalar multiplication of the sequence some constant $c$ that does not depend on $n,$ $s'_n = c s_{n}.$ These are both examples of linear sequence transformations.

Less trivial examples include the discrete convolution of sequences with another reference sequence. A particularly basic example is the difference operator, which is convolution with the sequence $(-1,1,0,\ldots)$ and is a discrete analog of the derivative; technically the shift operator and scalar multiplication can also be written as trivial discrete convolutions. The binomial transform and the Stirling transform are two linear transformations of a more general type.

An example of a nonlinear sequence transformation is Aitken's delta-squared process, used to improve the rate of convergence of a slowly convergent sequence. An extended form of this is the Shanks transformation. The Möbius transform is also a nonlinear transformation, only possible for integer sequences.

== See also ==
- Aitken's delta-squared process
- Anderson acceleration
- Minimum polynomial extrapolation
- Richardson extrapolation
- Series acceleration
- Steffensen's method
