= Antilimit =

In mathematics, the antilimit is the equivalent of a limit for a divergent series. The concept is not necessarily unique or well-defined, but the general idea is to find a formula for a series and then evaluate it outside its radius of convergence.

== Common divergent series ==
Series	Antilimit
1 + 1 + 1 + 1 + ⋯	-1/2
1 − 1 + 1 − 1 + ⋯ (Grandi's series)	1/2
1 + 2 + 3 + 4 + ⋯	-1/12
1 − 2 + 3 − 4 + ⋯	1/4
1 − 1 + 2 − 6 + 24 − 120 + …	0.59634736...
1 + 2 + 4 + 8 + ⋯	-1
1 − 2 + 4 − 8 + ⋯	1/3
1 + 1/2 + 1/3 + 1/4 + ⋯ (harmonic series)	$\gamma$

== See also ==
- Abel summation
- Cesàro summation
- Lindelöf summation
- Euler summation
- Borel summation
- Mittag-Leffler summation
- Lambert summation
- Euler–Boole summation and Van Wijngaarden transformation can also be used on divergent series
