= Kummer's transformation of series =

Mathematical method

In mathematics, specifically in the field of numerical analysis, Kummer's transformation of series is a method used to accelerate the convergence of an infinite series. The method was first suggested by Ernst Kummer in 1837.

== Technique ==
Let $A = \sum_{n=1}^\infty a_n$ be an infinite sum whose value we wish to compute, and let $B = \sum_{n=1}^\infty b_n$ be an infinite sum with comparable terms whose value is known. If the limit $\gamma := \lim_{n \to \infty} \frac{a_n}{b_n}$ exists, then $a_n-\gamma \,b_n$ is always also a sequence going to zero and the series given by the difference, $\sum_{n=1}^\infty (a_n - \gamma\, b_n)$, converges. If $\gamma \neq 0$, this new series differs from the original $\sum_{n=1}^\infty a_n$ and, under broad conditions, converges more rapidly. We may then compute $A$ as

$A = \gamma\,B + \sum_{n=1}^\infty (a_n - \gamma\,b_n),$

where $\gamma B$ is a constant. Where $a_n\neq 0$, the terms can be written as the product $(1-\gamma\,b_n/a_n)\,a_n$. If $a_n\neq 0$ for all $n$, the sum is over a component-wise product of two sequences going to zero,

$A=\gamma\,B + \sum_{n=1}^\infty (1-\gamma\,b_n/a_n)\,a_n$.

== Example ==
Consider the Leibniz formula for π: $1 \,-\, \frac{1}{3} \,+\, \frac{1}{5} \,-\, \frac{1}{7} \,+\, \frac{1}{9} \,-\, \cdots \,=\, \frac{\pi}{4}.$ We group terms in pairs as
$$\begin{align}
& 1 - \left(\frac{1}{3} - \frac{1}{5}\right) -  \left(\frac{1}{7} - \frac{1}{9}\right) + \cdots \\
&\quad = 1 - 2\left(\frac{1}{15} + \frac{1}{63} + \cdots \right) = 1-2A
\end{align}$$
where we identify $A = \sum_{n=1}^\infty \frac{1}{16n^2-1}.$ We apply Kummer's method to accelerate $A$, which will give an accelerated sum for computing $\pi=4-8A$.

Let
$$\begin{align}
B &= \sum_{n=1}^\infty \frac{1}{4n^2-1} = \frac{1}{3} + \frac{1}{15} + \cdots \\
&= \frac{1}{2} - \frac{1}{6} + \frac{1}{6} - \frac{1}{10} + \cdots
\end{align}$$
This is a telescoping series with sum value 1/2. In this case $\gamma := \lim_{n\to \infty} \frac{\frac{1}{16n^2-1}}{\frac{1}{4n^2-1}} = \lim_{n\to \infty} \frac{4n^2-1}{16n^2-1} = \frac{1}{4}$ and so Kummer's transformation formula above gives
$$\begin{align}
A &= \frac{1}{4} \cdot \frac{1}{2} + \sum_{n=1}^\infty \left ( 1-\frac{1}{4} \frac{\frac{1}{4n^2-1}}{\frac{1}{16n^2-1}} \right ) \frac{1}{16n^2-1} \\
&= \frac{1}{8} - \frac{3}{4} \sum_{n=1}^\infty \frac{1}{16n^2-1}\frac{1}{4n^2-1}
\end{align}$$
which converges much faster than the original series.

Coming back to Leibniz formula, we obtain a representation of $\pi$ that separates $3$ and involves a fastly converging sum over just the squared even numbers $(2n)^2$,
$$\begin{align}
\pi &= 4-8A \\
&= 3 + 6\cdot\sum_{n=1}^\infty \frac{1}{(4(2n)^2-1)((2n)^2-1)} \\
&= 3 + \frac{2}{15} + \frac{2}{315} + \frac{6}{5005} + \cdots
\end{align}$$

== See also ==
- Euler transform
