= Shanks transformation =

Non-linear series acceleration method

In numerical analysis, the Shanks transformation is a non-linear series acceleration method to increase the rate of convergence of a sequence. This method is named after Daniel Shanks, who rediscovered this sequence transformation in 1955. It was first derived and published by R. Schmidt in 1941.

One can calculate only a few terms of a perturbation expansion, usually no more than two or three, and almost never more than seven. The resulting series is often slowly convergent, or even divergent. Yet those few terms contain a remarkable amount of information, which the investigator should do his best to extract.
This viewpoint has been persuasively set forth in a delightful paper by Shanks (1955), who displays a number of amazing examples, including several from fluid mechanics.

— Milton D. Van Dyke (1975) Perturbation methods in fluid mechanics, p. 202.

== Formulation ==
For a sequence $\left\{a_m\right\}_{m\in\mathbb{N}}$ the series

$$A = \sum_{m=0}^\infty a_m\,$$

is to be determined. First, the partial sum $A_n$ is defined as:

$$A_n = \sum_{m=0}^n a_m\,$$

and forms a new sequence $\left\{A_n\right\}_{n\in\mathbb{N}}$. Provided the series converges, $A_n$ will also approach the limit $A$ as $n\to\infty.$ The Shanks transformation $S(A_n)$ of the sequence $A_n$ is the new sequence defined by

$$S(A_n) = \frac{A_{n+1}\, A_{n-1}\, -\, A_n^2}{A_{n+1}-2A_n+A_{n-1}} = A_{n+1} - \frac{(A_{n+1}-A_{n})^2}{(A_{n+1}-A_{n})-(A_{n}-A_{n-1})}$$

where this sequence $S(A_n)$ often converges more rapidly than the sequence $A_n.$ Further speed-up may be obtained by repeated use of the Shanks transformation, by computing $S^2(A_n)=S(S(A_n)),$ $S^3(A_n)=S(S(S(A_n))),$ etc.

Note that the non-linear transformation as used in the Shanks transformation is essentially the same as used in Aitken's delta-squared process so that as with Aitken's method, the right-most expression in $S(A_n)$'s definition (i.e. $S(A_n) = A_{n+1} - \frac{(A_{n+1}-A_{n})^2}{(A_{n+1}-A_{n})-(A_{n}-A_{n-1})}$) is more numerically stable than the expression to its left (i.e. $S(A_n) = \frac{A_{n+1}\, A_{n-1}\, -\, A_n^2}{A_{n+1}-2A_n+A_{n-1}}$). Both Aitken's method and the Shanks transformation operate on a sequence, but the sequence the Shanks transformation operates on is usually thought of as being a sequence of partial sums, although any sequence may be viewed as a sequence of partial sums.

== Example ==
Absolute error as a function of $n$ in the partial sums $A_n$ and after applying the Shanks transformation once or several times: $S(A_n),$ $S^2(A_n)$ and $S^3(A_n).$ The series used is $\scriptstyle 4\left(1-\frac13+\frac15-\frac17+\frac19-\cdots\right),$ which has the exact sum $\pi.$

As an example, consider the slowly convergent series

$$4 \sum_{k=0}^\infty (-1)^k \frac{1}{2k+1} = 4 \left( 1 - \frac{1}{3} + \frac{1}{5} - \frac{1}{7} + \cdots \right)$$

which has the exact sum π ≈ 3.14159265. The partial sum $A_6$ has only one digit accuracy, while six-figure accuracy requires summing about 400,000 terms.

In the table below, the partial sums $A_n$, the Shanks transformation $S(A_n)$ on them, as well as the repeated Shanks transformations $S^2(A_n)$ and $S^3(A_n)$ are given for $n$ up to 12. The figure to the right shows the absolute error for the partial sums and Shanks transformation results, clearly showing the improved accuracy and convergence rate.

$n$	$A_n$	$S(A_n)$	$S^2(A_n)$	$S^3(A_n)$
0	4.00000000	—	—	—
1	2.66666667	3.16666667	—	—
2	3.46666667	3.13333333	3.14210526	—
3	2.89523810	3.14523810	3.14145022	3.14159936
4	3.33968254	3.13968254	3.14164332	3.14159086
5	2.97604618	3.14271284	3.14157129	3.14159323
6	3.28373848	3.14088134	3.14160284	3.14159244
7	3.01707182	3.14207182	3.14158732	3.14159274
8	3.25236593	3.14125482	3.14159566	3.14159261
9	3.04183962	3.14183962	3.14159086	3.14159267
10	3.23231581	3.14140672	3.14159377	3.14159264
11	3.05840277	3.14173610	3.14159192	3.14159266
12	3.21840277	3.14147969	3.14159314	3.14159265

The Shanks transformation $S(A_1)$ already has two-digit accuracy, while the original partial sums only establish the same accuracy at $A_{24}.$ Remarkably, $S^3(A_3)$ has six digits accuracy, obtained from repeated Shanks transformations applied to the first seven terms $A_0, \ldots, A_6.$ As mentioned before, $A_n$ only obtains 6-digit accuracy after summing about 400,000 terms.

== Motivation ==
The Shanks transformation is motivated by the observation that — for larger $n$ — the partial sum $A_n$ quite often behaves approximately as

$$A_n = A + \alpha q^n, \,$$

with $|q|<1$ so that the sequence converges transiently to the series result $A$ for $n\to\infty.$ So for $n-1,$ $n$ and $n+1$ the respective partial sums are:

$$A_{n-1} = A + \alpha q^{n-1} \quad , \qquad A_n = A + \alpha q^n \qquad \text{and} \qquad A_{n+1} = A + \alpha q^{n+1}.$$

These three equations contain three unknowns: $A,$ $\alpha$ and $q.$ Solving for $A$ gives

$$A = \frac{A_{n+1}\, A_{n-1}\, -\, A_n^2}{A_{n+1}-2A_n+A_{n-1}}.$$

In the (exceptional) case that the denominator is equal to zero: then $A_n=A$ for all $n.$

== Generalized Shanks transformation ==
The generalized kth-order Shanks transformation is given as the ratio of the determinants:

$$S_k(A_n)
= \frac{
\begin{vmatrix}
A_{n-k}          & \cdots & A_{n-1}          & A_n              \\
\Delta A_{n-k}   & \cdots & \Delta A_{n-1}   & \Delta A_{n}     \\
\Delta A_{n-k+1} & \cdots & \Delta A_{n}     & \Delta A_{n+1}   \\
\vdots           &        & \vdots           & \vdots           \\
\Delta A_{n-1}   & \cdots & \Delta A_{n+k-2} & \Delta A_{n+k-1} \\
\end{vmatrix}
}{
\begin{vmatrix}
1                & \cdots & 1                & 1                \\
\Delta A_{n-k}   & \cdots & \Delta A_{n-1}   & \Delta A_{n}     \\
\Delta A_{n-k+1} & \cdots & \Delta A_{n}     & \Delta A_{n+1}   \\
\vdots           &        & \vdots           & \vdots           \\
\Delta A_{n-1}   & \cdots & \Delta A_{n+k-2} & \Delta A_{n+k-1} \\
\end{vmatrix}
},$$

with $\Delta A_p = A_{p+1} - A_p.$ It is the solution of a model for the convergence behaviour of the partial sums $A_n$ with $k$ distinct transients:

$$A_n = A + \sum_{p=1}^k \alpha_p q_p^n.$$

This model for the convergence behaviour contains $2k+1$ unknowns. By evaluating the above equation at the elements $A_{n-k}, A_{n-k+1}, \ldots, A_{n+k}$ and solving for $A,$ the above expression for the kth-order Shanks transformation is obtained. The first-order generalized Shanks transformation is equal to the ordinary Shanks transformation: $S_1(A_n)=S(A_n).$

The generalized Shanks transformation is closely related to Padé approximants and Padé tables.

Note: The calculation of determinants requires many arithmetic operations to make, however Peter Wynn discovered a recursive evaluation procedure called epsilon-algorithm which avoids calculating the determinants.

== See also ==
- Aitken's delta-squared process
- Anderson acceleration
- Rate of convergence
- Richardson extrapolation
- Sequence transformation
