= Stirling transform =

Mathematical operation on sequences

In combinatorial mathematics, the Stirling transform of a sequence { a_{n} : n = 1, 2, 3, ... } of numbers is the sequence { b_{n} : n = 1, 2, 3, ... } given by

$$b_n=\sum_{k=1}^n \left\{\begin{matrix} n \\ k \end{matrix} \right\} a_k$$,

where
$$\left\{\begin{matrix} n \\ k \end{matrix} \right\}$$
is the Stirling number of the second kind, which is the number of partitions of a set of size $n$ into $k$ parts. This is a linear sequence transformation.

The inverse transform is

$$a_n=\sum_{k=1}^n  (-1)^{n-k}  \left[{n \atop k}\right] b_k$$,

where $(-1)^{n-k} \left[{n\atop k}\right]$ is a signed Stirling number of the first kind, where the unsigned $\left[{n\atop k}\right]$ can be defined as the number of permutations on $n$ elements with $k$ cycles.

Berstein and Sloane (cited below) state "If a_{n} is the number of objects in some class with points labeled 1, 2, ..., n (with all labels distinct, i.e. ordinary labeled structures), then b_{n} is the number of objects with points labeled 1, 2, ..., n (with repetitions allowed)."

If

$$f(x) = \sum_{n=1}^\infty {a_n \over n!} x^n$$

is a formal power series, and

$$g(x) = \sum_{n=1}^\infty {b_n \over n!} x^n$$

with a_{n} and b_{n} as above, then

$$g(x) = f(e^x-1)$$.

Likewise, the inverse transform leads to the generating function identity

$$f(x) = g(\log(1+x))$$.

== See also ==
- Binomial transform
- Generating function transformation
- List of factorial and binomial topics
