= Lambert summation =

Summability method for a class of divergent series

In mathematical analysis and analytic number theory, Lambert summation is a summability method for summing infinite series related to Lambert series specially relevant in analytic number theory.

== Definition ==
Define the Lambert kernel by $L(x)=\log(1/x)\frac{x}{1-x}$ with $L(1)=1$. Note that $L(x^n)>0$ is decreasing as a function of $n$ when $0<x<1$. A sum $\sum_{n=0}^\infty a_n$ is Lambert summable to $A$ if $\lim_{x\to 1^-}\sum_{n=0}^\infty a_n L(x^n)=A$, written $\sum_{n=0}^\infty a_n=A\,\,(\mathrm{L})$.

== Abelian and Tauberian theorem ==
Abelian theorem: If a series is convergent to $A$ then it is Lambert summable to $A$.

Tauberian theorem: Suppose that $\sum_{n=1}^\infty a_n$ is Lambert summable to $A$. Then it is Abel summable to $A$. In particular, if $\sum_{n=0}^\infty a_n$ is Lambert summable to $A$ and $na_n\geq -C$ then $\sum_{n=0}^\infty a_n$ converges to $A$.

The Tauberian theorem was first proven by G. H. Hardy and John Edensor Littlewood but was not independent of number theory, in fact they used a number-theoretic estimate which is somewhat stronger than the prime number theorem itself. The unsatisfactory situation around the Lambert Tauberian theorem was resolved by Norbert Wiener.

== Examples ==
- $\sum_{n=1}^\infty \frac{\mu(n)}{n} = 0 \,(\mathrm{L})$, where μ is the Möbius function. Hence if this series converges at all, it converges to zero. Note that the sequence $\frac{\mu(n)}{n}$ satisfies the Tauberian condition, therefore the Tauberian theorem implies $\sum_{n=1}^\infty \frac{\mu(n)}{n}=0$ in the ordinary sense. This is equivalent to the prime number theorem.
- $\sum_{n=1}^\infty \frac{\Lambda(n)-1}{n}=-2\gamma\,\,(\mathrm{L})$ where $\Lambda$ is von Mangoldt function and $\gamma$ is Euler's constant. By the Tauberian theorem, the ordinary sum converges and in particular converges to $-2\gamma$. This is equivalent to $\psi(x)\sim x$ where $\psi$ is the second Chebyshev function.

== See also ==
- Lambert series
- Abel–Plana formula
- Abelian and tauberian theorems
