= Abel–Plana formula =

Summation formula in Mathematics

In mathematics, the Abel–Plana formula is a summation formula discovered independently by Niels Henrik Abel (1823) and Giovanni Antonio Amedeo Plana (1820). It states that

$\sum_{n=0}^{\infty}f\left(a+n\right)= \frac{f\left(a\right)}{2}+\int_{a}^{\infty}f\left(x\right)dx+i\int_{0}^{\infty}\frac{f\left(a+it\right)-f\left(a-it\right)}{e^{2\pi t}-1}dt$

For the case $a=0$ we have

$$\sum_{n=0}^\infty f(n)=\frac{f(0)}{2} + \int_0^\infty f(x) \, dx+ i \int_0^\infty \frac{f(i t)-f(-i t)}{e^{2\pi t}-1} \, dt.$$

It holds for functions ƒ that are holomorphic in the region Re(z) ≥ 0, and satisfy a suitable growth condition in this region; for example it is enough to assume that |ƒ| is bounded by C/|z|^{1+ε} in this region for some constants C, ε > 0, though the formula also holds under much weaker bounds. (Olver 1997, p.290).

An example is provided by the Hurwitz zeta function,

$$\zeta(s,\alpha)= \sum_{n=0}^\infty \frac{1}{(n+\alpha)^s} =
\frac{\alpha^{1-s}}{s-1} + \frac 1{2\alpha^s} + 2\int_0^\infty\frac{\sin\left(s \arctan \frac t \alpha\right)}{(\alpha^2+t^2)^\frac s 2}\frac{dt}{e^{2\pi t}-1},$$

which holds for all $s \in \mathbb{C}$, s ≠ 1. Another powerful example is applying the formula to the function $e^{-n}n^{x}$: we obtain

$\Gamma(x+1)=\operatorname{Li}_{-x}\left(e^{-1}\right)+\theta(x)$ where $\Gamma(x)$ is the gamma function, $\operatorname{Li}_{s}\left(z\right)$ is the polylogarithm and $\theta(x)=\int_{0}^{\infty}\frac{2t^{x}}{e^{2\pi t}-1}\sin\left(\frac{\pi x}{2}-t\right)dt$.

Abel also gave the following variation for alternating sums:

$$\sum_{n=0}^\infty (-1)^nf(n)= \frac {1}{2} f(0)+i \int_0^\infty \frac{f(i t)-f(-i t)}{2\sinh(\pi t)} \, dt,$$

which is related to the Lindelöf summation formula

$$\sum_{k=m}^\infty (-1)^kf(k)=(-1)^m\int_{-\infty}^\infty f(m-1/2+ix)\frac{dx}{2\cosh(\pi x)}.$$

== Proof ==
Let $f$ be holomorphic on $\Re(z) \ge 0$, such that $f(0) = 0$, $f(z) = O(|z|^k)$ and for $\operatorname{arg}(z)\in (-\beta,\beta)$, $f(z) = O(|z|^{-1-\delta})$. Taking $a=e^{i \beta/2}$ with the residue theorem
$$\int_{a^{-1}\infty}^0 + \int_0^{a\infty} \frac{f(z)}{e^{-2i\pi z}-1} \, dz = -2i\pi \sum_{n = 0}^\infty \operatorname{Res}\left(\frac{f(z)}{e^{-2i\pi z}-1}\right)=\sum_{n=0}^\infty f(n).$$

Then
$$\begin{align}
\int_{a^{-1}\infty}^0 \frac{f(z)}{e^{-2i\pi z}-1} \, dz&=-\int_0^{a^{-1}\infty} \frac{f(z)}{e^{-2i\pi z}-1} \, dz \\
&=\int_0^{a^{-1}\infty}\frac{f(z)}{e^{2i\pi z}-1} \, dz+\int_0^{a^{-1}\infty} f(z) \, dz\\
&= \int_0^\infty \frac{f(a^{-1}t)}{e^{2i\pi a^{-1} t}-1} \, d(a^{-1}t)+\int_0^\infty f(t) \, dt.
\end{align}$$

Using the Cauchy integral theorem for the last one.
$$\int_0^{a\infty} \frac{f(z)}{e^{-2i\pi z}-1} \, dz = \int_0^\infty \frac{f(at)}{e^{-2i\pi a t}-1} \, d(at),$$
thus obtaining
$$\sum_{n=0}^\infty f(n)=\int_0^\infty \left(f(t)+\frac{a\, f(a t)}{e^{-2i\pi a t}-1} + \frac{a^{-1} f(a^{-1}t)}{e^{2i\pi a^{-1} t}-1}\right) \, dt.$$

This identity stays true by analytic continuation everywhere the integral converges, letting $a\to i$ we obtain the Abel–Plana formula
$$\sum_{n=0}^\infty f(n)=\int_0^\infty \left(f(t)+\frac{i\, f(i t)-i\, f(-it)}{e^{2\pi t}-1}\right) \, dt.$$

The case ƒ(0) ≠ 0 is obtained similarly, replacing $\int_{a^{-1}\infty}^{a\infty} \frac{f(z)}{e^{-2i\pi z}-1} \, dz$ by two integrals following the same curves with a small indentation on the left and right of 0.

== See also ==
- Euler–Maclaurin summation formula
- Euler–Boole summation
- Ramanujan summation
