= Euler–Boole summation =

Summation method for some divergent series

In mathematics, Euler–Boole summation is a method for summing alternating series. The concept is named after Leonhard Euler and George Boole. Boole published this summation method, using Euler's polynomials, but the method itself was likely already known to Euler.

Euler's polynomials are defined by

$\displaystyle\frac{2e^{xt}}{e^t+1}=\sum_{n=0}^\infty E_n(x)\frac{t^n}{n!}.$

The periodic Euler functions modify these by a sign change depending on the parity of the integer part of $x$:

$\displaystyle\widetilde E_n(x+1)=-\widetilde E_n(x)\text{ and } \widetilde E_n(x)=E_n(x) \text{ for } 0<x<1.$

The Euler–Boole formula to sum alternating series is

$$\begin{align}
\displaystyle\sum_{j=a}^{n-1}(-1)^j f(j+h) = {}&\frac{1}{2}\sum_{k=0}^{m-1} \frac{E_k(h)}{k!} \left((-1)^{n-1} f^{(k)}(n)+(-1)^a f^{(k)}(a)\right)\\
&{}+ \frac 1 {2(m-1)!} \int_a^n f^{(m)}(x)\widetilde E_{m-1}(h-x) \, dx,
\end{align}$$

where $a,m,n\in\N, a<n, h\in [0,1]$ and $f^{(k)}$ is the kth derivative.
