= Hadamard product =

In mathematics, the Hadamard product may refer to:

- Hadamard product of two matrices, the matrix such that each entry is the product of the corresponding entries of the input matrices
- Hadamard product of two power series, the power series whose coefficients are the product of the corresponding coefficients of the input series
- a product involved in the Hadamard factorization theorem for entire functions of finite order
- an infinite product expansion for the Riemann zeta function
