= Mittag-Leffler's theorem =

Mathematical theorem in complex analysis

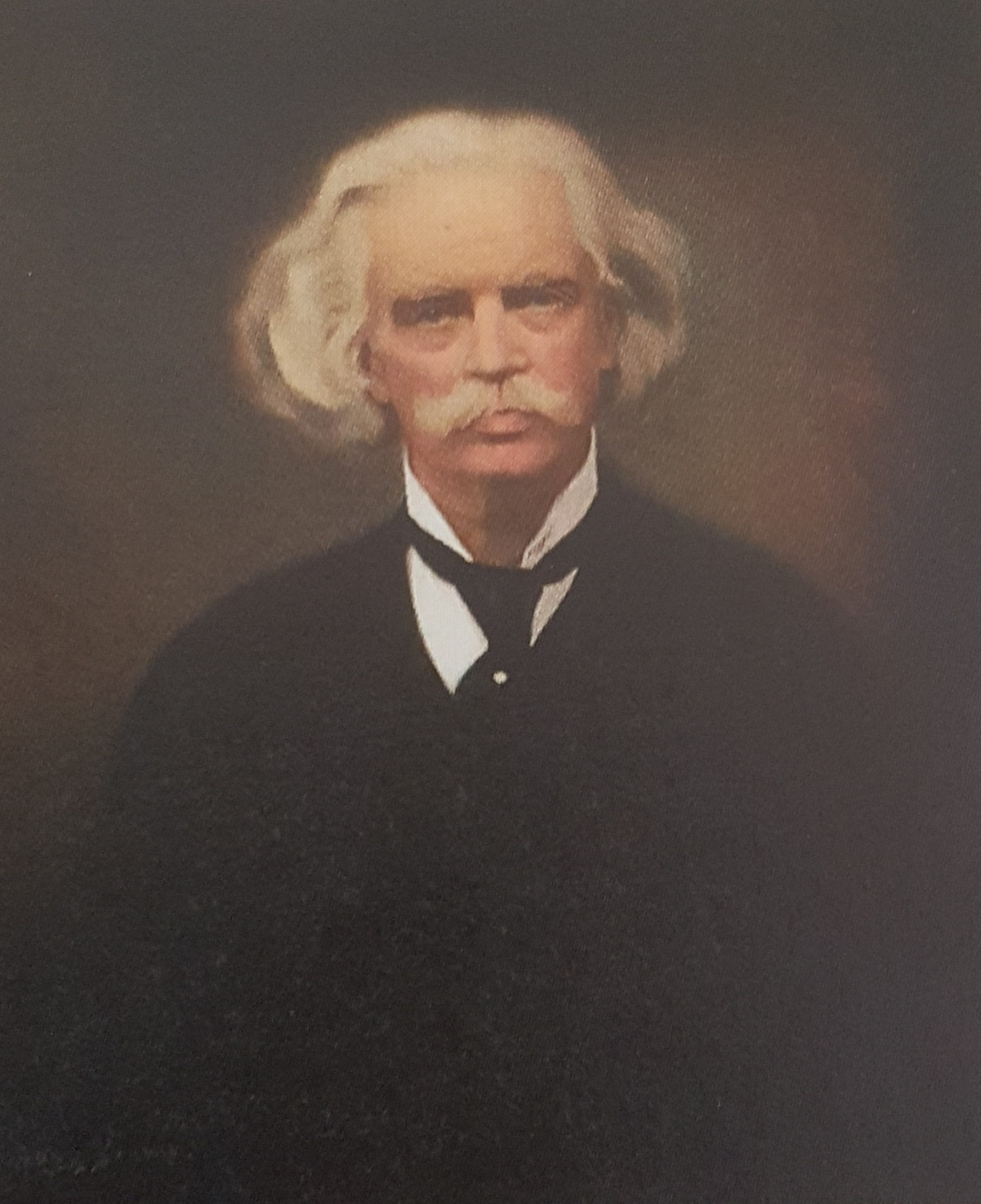
Portrait of Gösta Mittag-Leffler

In complex analysis, Mittag-Leffler's theorem concerns the existence of meromorphic functions with prescribed poles. Conversely, it can be used to express any meromorphic function as a sum of partial fractions. It is sister to the Weierstrass factorization theorem, which asserts existence of holomorphic functions with prescribed zeros.

The theorem is named after the Swedish mathematician Gösta Mittag-Leffler who published versions of the theorem in 1876 and 1884.

== Theorem ==
Let $U$ be an open set in $\mathbb C$ and $E \subset U$ be a subset whose limit points, if any, occur on the boundary of $U$. For each $a$ in $E$, let $p_a(z)$ be a polynomial in $1/(z-a)$ with constant coefficient, i.e. of the form
$$p_a(z) = \sum_{n=1}^{N_a} \frac{c_{a,n}}{(z-a)^n}.$$
Then there exists a meromorphic function $f$ on $U$ whose poles are precisely the elements of $E$ and such that for each such pole $a \in E$, the function $f(z)-p_a(z)$ has only a removable singularity at $a$; in particular, the principal part of $f$ at $a$ is $p_a(z)$. Furthermore, any other meromorphic function $g$ on $U$ with these properties can be obtained as $g=f+h$, where $h$ is an arbitrary holomorphic function on $U$. (Here, note that a function being analytic and holomorphic are equivalent attributes)

=== Proof sketch ===
One possible proof outline is as follows. If $E$ is finite, it suffices to take $f(z) = \sum_{a \in E} p_a(z)$. If $E$ is not finite, consider the finite sum $S_F(z) = \sum_{a \in F} p_a(z)$ where $F$ is a finite subset of $E$. While the $S_F(z)$ may not converge as F approaches E, one may subtract well-chosen rational functions with poles outside of $U$ (provided by Runge's theorem) without changing the principal parts of the $S_F(z)$ and in such a way that convergence is guaranteed.

== Example ==
Suppose that we desire a meromorphic function with simple poles of residue 1 at all positive integers. With notation as above, letting
$$p_k(z) = \frac{1}{z-k}$$
and $E = \mathbb{Z}^+$, Mittag-Leffler's theorem asserts the existence of a meromorphic function $f$ with principal part $p_k(z)$ at $z=k$ for each positive integer $k$. More constructively we can let
$$f(z) = z\sum_{k=1}^\infty \frac{1}{k(z-k)} .$$

This series converges normally on any compact subset of $\mathbb{C} \smallsetminus \mathbb{Z}^+$ (as can be shown using the M-test) to a meromorphic function with the desired properties.

== Pole expansions of meromorphic functions ==
Here are some examples of pole expansions of meromorphic functions:
$$\pi\csc(\pi z)
= \sum_{n\in\Z} \frac{(-1)^n}{z-n}
= \frac1z + 2z\sum_{n=1}^\infty \frac{(-1)^n}{z^2 - n^2}$$
$$\pi\sec(\pi z)
= \sum_{n\in\Z} \frac{(-1)^{n-1}}{z-\left(n+\frac12\right)}
= 2\sum_{n=0}^\infty \frac{(-1)^{n-1}(n+\frac12)}{z^2-(n+\frac12)^2}$$
$$\pi\cot(\pi z)
= \lim_{N\to\infty}\sum_{n=-N}^N \frac1{z-n}
= \frac1z + 2z\sum_{n=1}^\infty \frac1{z^2 - n^2}$$
$$\pi\tan(\pi z) = \lim_{N\to\infty}\sum_{n=-N}^N \frac{-1}{z-(n+\frac12)} = 2z\sum_{n=0}^\infty \frac{-1}{z^2-(n+\frac12)^2}$$
$$(\pi\csc(\pi z))^2 = \sum_{n \in \Z} \frac1{(z-n)^2}$$
$$(\pi\sec(\pi z))^2 = \sum_{n \in \Z} \frac1{(z-(n+\frac12))^2}$$

== See also ==
- Riemann–Roch theorem
- Liouville's theorem
- Mittag-Leffler condition of an inverse limit
- Mittag-Leffler summation
- Mittag-Leffler function
