= Gösta Mittag-Leffler =

Swedish mathematician (1846–1927)

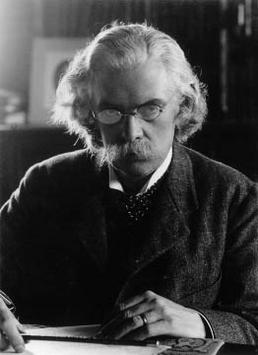
- Gösta Mittag-Leffler
- Born: 16 March 1846; Stockholm
- Died: 7 July 1927 (aged 81); Djursholm
- Citizenship: Swedish
- Education: Uppsala University (PhD, 1872)
- Scientific career
- Fields: Mathematics
- Thesis: Om skiljandet af rötterna till en synektisk funktion af en variabel (1872)
- Doctoral advisor: Göran Dillner
- Doctoral students: Ivar Fredholm; Hjalmar Mellin; Gustav Cassel

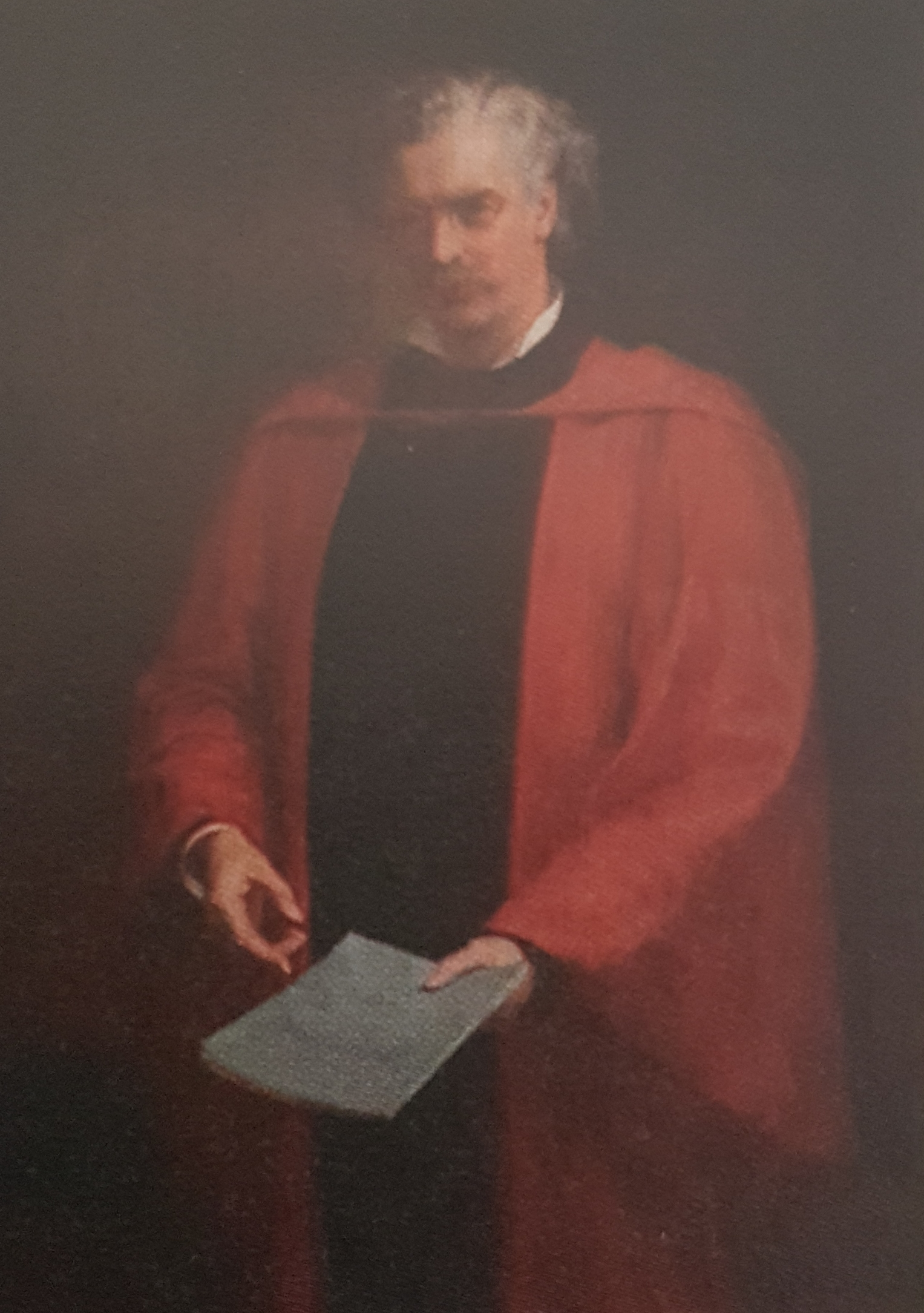
Portrait by Albert Edelfelt

Magnus Gustaf "Gösta" Mittag-Leffler (16 March 1846 – 7 July 1927) was a Swedish mathematician. His mathematical contributions are connected chiefly with the theory of functions that today is called complex analysis. He founded the prestigious mathematical periodical Acta Mathematica and was its editor for 40 years.

Mittag-Leffler was known as an advocate for female intellectual workers in an era when contributions by women were often overlooked or miscredited to men. He took great trouble in procuring Sofia Kovalevskaya a position of full professor of mathematics in Stockholm University. Mittag-Leffler was responsible for inducing the Nobel committee to recognize Marie Curie as an equal contributor to the discoveries "on the radiation phenomena" along with her husband Pierre Curie. Mittag-Leffler also began the process of nominating Henrietta Swan Leavett for the Nobel Prize in Physics for her identification of Cepheid variable stars, crucial to Edwin Hubble's work on the true size of the universe, however this had to be abandoned due to the astronomer's untimely death from stomach cancer in 1921.^{:118}

After World War I, Mittag-Leffler gave his estate in Djursholm and its remarkable library of books on mathematics to the Royal Swedish Academy of Sciences; it became the foundation of the modern Mittag-Leffler Institute.

== Biography ==
=== Early years and education ===
Mittag-Leffler was born in Stockholm and became the first son of the school teacher John Olof Leffler and Gustava Wilhelmina, née Mittag. Soon after Gustav's birth his father was promoted to a school principal. The family lived in the school building then and their address was simply "Katarina Schoolhouse". Only a few years later they managed to purchase their own house. Soon, three Gustav's siblings were born: Anna-Maria, Frits, and Arthur. Anna-Maria grew into a famous writer, Frits became a linguist, and Arthur became a civil engineer. As all children recalled, Olof and Gustava held an open and hospitable house, they often were visited by mutual friends. As an adult, Gustav claimed that a significant part of his early education he received at home by listening to their guests. For all his life, he also remembered his maternal grandparents with great affection. He used to stay in their Fågelås house every summer. As a tribute to his maternal relatives, at the age of 20, Gustav added his mother's maiden name to his paternal surname.

In 1855, Gustav went to Klara Elementary School in Stockholm. The school was respectable and upper class families brought their children there. Still, in recollections of August Strindberg it was "a setting straight out of Dickens novels" with severe fights between students, frequent beatings by teachers, and very strict atmosphere. Still, Gustav showed himself a gifted student. In Klara school Gustav met Viktor Rydberg.

Mittag-Leffler entered the Uppsala University when Göran Dillner was in charge of its mathematical research and teaching. Under his guidance Mittag-Leffler wrote and defended a thesis, which was described by his biographers as "less than remarkable". Nevertheless, he completed his PhD in 1872 and became docent at the university the same year.

In 1873, Mittag-Leffler won a Byzantine stipend. Given by a Swede donor who lived in Constantinople, it had a condition: that a receiver must study abroad for three years. Thus, in the years 1873-1876 Mittag-Leffler was studying in the three most important XIXth century centers of mathematics: University of Paris, Humboldt University of Berlin, and University of Göttingen. In October 1873, he arrived in Paris, where he soon acquainted Darboux, Joseph Liouville, Charles Auguste Briot, Jean Claude Bouquet, and several other prominent mathematicians of the time. In Paris, Mittag-Leffler attended lectures of Charles Hermite on elliptic functions, but found Hermite's style old-fashioned and the lectures very difficult to follow. In Spring 1874, he moved to Berlin and started attending Karl Weierstrass's lectures on elliptic functions. Weierstrass influenced Mittag-Leffler greatly, his views and methods shaped all future courses of Mittag-Leffler's studies. During this period he edited a weekly newspaper, Ny Illustrerad Tidning, which was based in Stockholm.

=== Active years ===
In 1877, Mittag-Leffler became the professor of mathematics at the University of Helsinki as successor to Lorenz Lindelöf. The thesis Mittag-Leffler submitted for the position was described by peers as brilliant, even by Ernst Leonard Lindelöf, one of 4 other applicants. In Helsinki Mittag-Leffler lectured on elliptic functions and basic analysis. He supervised many thesis students some of whom later moved to Sweden permanently to work close to him.

In 1881, he resigned from the University of Helsinki and on June 11 became the first professor of mathematics at the newly founded University College of Stockholm (the later Stockholm University).

In 1882, he married Signe Lindfors. She came from an wealthy and distinguished Finnish family. Her father Jacob Julius af Lindfors was a major-general and led a successful business, while her mother Maria Emilia Borgström was from one of the richest merchant families in Helsinki.

In 1889, Mittag-Leffler purchased two land lots about 0.5 hectare each in Djursholm. Gradually, he bought several more and by the early 1890s became the biggest landlord in Midgård. By April 1891, he built a family house. Three leading architects of that time collaborated in the project — Rudolf Arborelius, Carl Westman, and Ferdinand Boberg. Mittag-Leffler's house soon became famous for its hospitality, and many prominent mathematicians from different countries visited Djursholm. In its remarkable library that even had volumes from the XVIth century, all guests were welcomed to work. Mittag-Leffler himself worked there editing Acta Mathematica. Thus, Djursholm estate became a hub of mathematics research.

By 1899, Mittag-Leffler was already a member of the Royal Swedish Academy of Sciences (1883), the Finnish Society of Sciences and Letters (1878, later honorary member), the Royal Swedish Society of Sciences in Uppsala, the Royal Physiographic Society in Lund (1906) and about 30 foreign learned societies, including the Royal Society of London (1896) and Académie des sciences in Paris (1900). He held honorary doctorates from the University of Oxford and several other universities.

Mittag-Leffler was a convinced advocate of women's rights. He served as an intermediary to help Sofia Kovalevskaya become a full professor of mathematics in Stockholm. With his help, in 1884 she became the first woman anywhere in the world to hold that position. After her death he put a lot of effort into preventing her scientific image from being distorted in times when her accomplishments were under constant attacks of skeptics, critics and mere detractors. As a member of the Nobel Prize Committee in 1903, Mittag-Leffler was responsible for inducing the committee to award the prize for Physics jointly to Marie and Pierre Curie, instead of just Pierre.

=== Acta Mathematica ===
In 1882, Mittag-Leffler founded the mathematical journal Acta Mathematica. His idea was to create an international publication that would publish works written by the best scientists of the world. He also cherished the thought that mathematics was the science of pure thought and the first among sciences. In the early 1880s, through his former teacher Charles Hermite, Mittag-Leffler became acquainted with Paul Appell, Émile Picard, and Henri Poincaré. Mittag-Leffler offered Poincaré editorial help and fast publication of his recent manuscript on Fuchsian groups. This work became the basis of the first issue. Mittag-Leffler spent his honeymoon traveling through Europe persuading mathematicians to join the project, and managed to secure a constant flow of good articles. The journal required substantial funding, it was obtained with the help of King Oscar, and partly paid for with the fortune of Mittag-Leffler's wife Signe. On December 12, 1882, king Oscar as the first subscriber received the very first copy of Acta Mathematica. After only a few years the publication became self-supporting. Very soon it became the most prestigious of all mathematical research journals.

=== Late years ===
Mittag-Leffler retired in 1911, but for more than 15 years he continued working on Acta Mathematica. He went into business and started investing in such enterprises as F. & G. Beijer Publishing Company, Alby factories, etc. Earlier, he had become associates with Henrik Palme and in time obtained several posts and positions in his insurance and financial institutions. But after World War I Mittag-Leffler lost most of his fortune, it became virtually impossible for him to run the estate. In 1916 he turned his Djursholm estate into a national trust. That was the beginning of the Mittag-Leffler Institute.

=== Death and legacy ===
The Djursholm estate and its contents were donated to the Academy of Sciences and became the Mittag-Leffler Institute. The director post at the Mittag-Leffler Institute was esteemed particularly highly by Swedish mathematicians.

Mittag-Lefflerbreen, a glacier at Spitsbergen, Svalbard, was named in his honour in 1934.

== Works and accomplishments ==
- Mittag-Leffler distribution
- Mittag-Leffler function
- Mittag-Leffler polynomials
- Mittag-Leffler star
- Mittag-Leffler summation
- Mittag-Leffler theorem
- Mittag-Leffler condition of an inverse limit

== Sources ==
- Cooke, R. (1984). The Mathematics of Sonya Kovalevskaya. New York: Springer-Verlag. p. 91. ISBN 9781461252740.
- Fant, Kenne (2006). Alfred Nobel: A Biography. New York: Arcade Publishing. ISBN 978-1-55970-328-4.
- Gårding, Lars (1998). Mathematics and Mathematicians. American Mathematical Soc. ISBN 978-0-8218-9045-5.
- G. H. H. (1928). "Magnus Gustaf Mittag-Leffler". Proceedings of the Royal Society of London. Series A, Containing Papers of a Mathematical and Physical Character. 119 (783). JSTOR 94958.
- Gårding, Lars (1998). "Gösta Mittag-Leffler — a biography". Mathematics and Mathematicians. Mathematics in Sweden before 1950. History of mathematics. Vol. 13. American Mathematical Society. p. 73. ISBN 978-0-8218-9045-5.
- Keen, Linda (1985). The Legacy of Sonya Kovalevskaya. American Mathematical Society. p. 65. ISBN 9780821850671.
- McKinnon Riehm, Elaine; Hoffman, Frances (2011). Turbulent Times in Mathematics: The Life of J.C. Fields and the History of the Fields Medal. American Mathematical Society. ISBN 9780821869147.
- Quinn, Susan (2019). Marie Curie: A Life. Plunkett Lake Press. ISBN 9780201887945.
- Stubhaug, Arild (2010). Gösta Mittag-Leffler: A Man of Conviction. Oslo: Springer. ISBN 978-3-642-11671-1.
