= Entire =

Entire may refer to:

- Entire function, a function that is holomorphic on the whole complex plane
- Entire (animal), an indication that an animal is not neutered
- Entire (botany), a term in botany

== See also ==
- Entier function, the integer part of a number
