= Nachbin's theorem =

Theorem bounding the growth rate of analytic functions

In mathematics, in the area of complex analysis, Nachbin's theorem (named after Leopoldo Nachbin) is a result used to establish bounds on the growth rates for analytic functions. In particular, Nachbin's theorem may be used to give the domain of convergence of the generalized Borel transform, also called Nachbin summation.

This article provides a brief review of growth rates, including the idea of a function of exponential type. Classification of growth rates based on type help provide a finer tool than big O or Landau notation, since a number of theorems about the analytic structure of the bounded function and its integral transforms can be stated.

== Exponential type ==
A function $f(z)$ defined on the complex plane is said to be of exponential type if there exist constants $M$ and $\alpha$ such that

$$|f(re^{i\theta})|\le Me^{\alpha r}$$

in the limit of $r\to\infty$. Here, the complex variable $z$ was written as $z=re^{i\theta}$ to emphasize that the limit must hold in all directions $\theta$. Letting $\alpha$ stand for the infimum of all such $\alpha$, one then says that the function $f$ is of exponential type $\alpha$.

For example, let $f(z)=\sin(\pi z)$. Then one says that $\sin(\pi z)$ is of exponential type $\pi$, since $\pi$ is the smallest number that bounds the growth of $\sin(\pi z)$ along the imaginary axis. So, for this example, Carlson's theorem cannot apply, as it requires functions of exponential type less than $\pi$.

== Ψ type ==
Additional function types may be defined for other bounding functions besides the exponential function. In general, a function $\Psi(t)$ is a comparison function if it has a series

$$\Psi(t)=\sum_{n=0}^\infty \Psi_n t^n$$

with $\Psi_n>0$ for all $n$, and

$$\lim_{n\to\infty} \frac{\Psi_{n+1}}{\Psi_n} = 0.$$

Comparison functions are necessarily entire, which follows from the ratio test. If $\Psi(t)$ is such a comparison function, one then says that $f$ is of $\Psi$-type if there exist constants $M$ and $\tau$ such that

$$\left|f\left(re^{i\theta}\right)\right| \le M\Psi(\tau r)$$

as $r\to \infty$. If $\tau$ is the infimum of all such $\tau$ one says that $f$ is of $\Psi$-type $\tau$.

Nachbin's theorem states that a function $f(z)$ with the series

$$f(z)=\sum_{n=0}^\infty f_n z^n$$

is of $\Psi$-type $\tau$ if and only if

$$\limsup_{n\to\infty} \left| \frac{f_n}{\Psi_n} \right|^{1/n} = \tau.$$

This is naturally connected to the root test and can be considered a relative of the Cauchy–Hadamard theorem.

== Generalized Borel transform ==
Nachbin's theorem has immediate applications in Cauchy theorem-like situations, and for integral transforms. For example, the generalized Borel transform is given by

$$F(w)=\sum_{n=0}^\infty \frac{f_n}{\Psi_n w^{n+1}}.$$

If $f$ is of $\Psi$-type $\tau$, then the exterior of the domain of convergence of $F(w)$, and all of its singular points, are contained within the disk

$$|w| \le \tau.$$

Furthermore, one has

$$f(z)=\frac{1}{2\pi i} \oint_\gamma \Psi (zw) F(w)\, dw$$

where the contour of integration γ encircles the disk $|w| \le \tau$. This generalizes the usual Borel transform for functions of exponential type, where $\Psi(t)=e^t$. The integral form for the generalized Borel transform follows as well. Let $\alpha(t)$ be a function whose first derivative is bounded on the interval $[0,\infty)$ and that satisfies the defining equation

$$\frac{1}{\Psi_n} = \int_0^\infty t^n\, d\alpha(t)$$

where $d\alpha(t)=\alpha^{\prime}(t)\,dt$. Then the integral form of the generalized Borel transform is

$$F(w)=\frac{1}{w} \int_0^\infty f \left(\frac{t}{w}\right) \, d\alpha(t).$$

The ordinary Borel transform is regained by setting $\alpha(t)=-e^{-t}$. Note that the integral form of the Borel transform is the Laplace transform.

== Nachbin summation ==
Nachbin summation can be used to sum divergent series that Borel summation does not, for instance to asymptotically solve integral equations of the form:

$$g(s)=s\int_0^\infty K(st) f(t)\,dt$$

where $g(s)= \sum_{n=0}^\infty a_n s^{-n}$, $f(t)$ may or may not be of exponential type, and the kernel $K(u)$ has a Mellin transform. The solution can be obtained using Nachbin summation as $f(x)= \sum_{n=0}^\infty \frac{a_n}{M(n+1)}x^n$ with the $a_n$ from $g(s)$ and with $M(n)$ the Mellin transform of $K(u)$. An example of this is the Gram series $\pi (x) \approx 1+\sum_{n=1}^{\infty} \frac{\log^{n}(x)}{n\cdot n!\zeta (n+1)}.$

In some cases as an extra condition we require $\int_0^\infty K(t)t^{n}\,dt$ to be finite and nonzero for $n=0,1,2,3,....$

== Fréchet space ==
Collections of functions of exponential type $\tau$ can form a complete uniform space, namely a Fréchet space, by the topology induced by the countable family of norms

$$\|f\|_{n} = \sup_{z \in \mathbb{C}} \exp \left[-\left(\tau + \frac{1}{n}\right)|z|\right]|f(z)|.$$

== See also ==
- Divergent series
- Borel summation
- Euler summation
- Cesàro summation
- Lambert summation
- Mittag-Leffler summation
- Phragmén–Lindelöf principle
- Abelian and tauberian theorems
- Van Wijngaarden transformation
