= Poisson formula =

In mathematics, the Poisson formula, named after Siméon Denis Poisson, may refer to:

- Poisson distribution in probability
- Poisson summation formula in Fourier analysis
- Poisson kernel in complex or harmonic analysis
- Poisson–Jensen formula in complex analysis
