= Behavioral modeling =

The behavioral approach to systems theory and control theory was initiated in the late-1970s by J. C. Willems as a result of resolving inconsistencies present in classical approaches based on state-space, transfer function, and convolution representations. This approach is also motivated by the aim of obtaining a general framework for system analysis and control that respects the underlying physics.

The main object in the behavioral setting is the behavior – the set of all signals compatible with the system. An important feature of the behavioral approach is that it does not distinguish a priority between input and output variables. Apart from putting system theory and control on a rigorous basis, the behavioral approach unified the existing approaches and brought new results on controllability for nD systems, control via interconnection, and system identification.

== Dynamical system as a set of signals ==
In the behavioral setting, a dynamical system is a triple

$$\Sigma=(\mathbb{T},\mathbb{W},\mathcal{B})$$

where

- $\mathbb{T}\subseteq\mathbb{R}$ is the "time set" – the time instances over which the system evolves,
- $\mathbb{W}$ is the "signal space" – the set in which the variables whose time evolution is modeled take on their values, and
- $\mathcal{B}\subseteq \mathbb{W}^\mathbb{T}$ the "behavior" – the set of signals that are compatible with the laws of the system

($\mathbb{W}^\mathbb{T}$ denotes the set of all signals, i.e., functions from $\mathbb{T}$ into $\mathbb{W}$).

$w\in\mathcal{B}$ means that $w$ is a trajectory of the system, while $w\notin\mathcal{B}$ means that the laws of the system forbid the trajectory $w$ to happen. Before the phenomenon is modeled, every signal in $\mathbb{W}^\mathbb{T}$ is deemed possible, while after modeling, only the outcomes in $\mathcal{B}$ remain as possibilities.

Special cases:

- $\mathbb{T}=\mathbb{R}$ – continuous-time systems
- $\mathbb{T}=\mathbb{Z}$ – discrete-time systems
- $\mathbb{W} = \mathbb{R}^q$ – most physical systems
- $\mathbb{W}$ a finite set – discrete event systems

== Linear time-invariant differential systems ==
System properties are defined in terms of the behavior. The system $\Sigma=(\mathbb{T},\mathbb{W},\mathcal{B})$ is said to be

- "linear" if $\mathbb{W}$ is a vector space and $\mathcal{B}$ is a linear subspace of $\mathbb{W}^\mathbb{T}$,
- "time-invariant" if the time set consists of the real or natural numbers and

$\sigma^t\mathcal{B} \subseteq\mathcal{B}$ for all $t\in\mathbb{T}$,

where $\sigma^t$ denotes the $t$-shift, defined by

$$\sigma^t(f)(t'):=f(t'+t)$$.

In these definitions linearity articulates the superposition law, while time-invariance articulates that the time-shift of a legal trajectory is in its turn a legal trajectory.

A "linear time-invariant differential system" is a dynamical system $\Sigma=(\mathbb{R},\mathbb{R}^q,\mathcal{B})$ whose behavior $\mathcal{B}$ is the solution set of a system of constant coefficient linear ordinary differential equations $R(d/dt) w=0$, where $R$ is a matrix of polynomials with real coefficients. The coefficients of $R$ are the parameters of the model. In order to define the corresponding behavior, we need to specify when we consider a signal $w:\mathbb{R}\rightarrow\mathbb{R}^q$ to be a solution of $R(d/dt) w=0$. For ease of exposition, often infinite differentiable solutions are considered. There are other possibilities, as taking distributional solutions, or solutions in $\mathcal{L}^{\rm local}(\mathbb{R},\mathbb{R}^q)$, and with the ordinary differential equations interpreted in the sense of distributions. The behavior defined is

$$\mathcal{B} = \{ w\in\mathcal{C}^\infty(\mathbb{R},\mathbb{R}^q) ~ | ~  R(d/dt) w(t) = 0 \text{ for all } t\in\mathbb{R}\}.$$

This particular way of representing the system is called "kernel representation" of the corresponding dynamical system. There are many other useful representations of the same behavior, including transfer function, state space, and convolution.

For accessible sources regarding the behavioral approach, see .

== Observability of latent variables ==
A key question of the behavioral approach is whether a quantity w1 can be deduced given an observed quantity w2 and a model. If w1 can be deduced given w2 and the model, w2 is said to be observable. In terms of mathematical modeling, the to-be-deduced quantity or variable is often referred to as the latent variable and the observed variable is the manifest variable. Such a system is then called an observable (latent variable) system.

== Additional sources ==
- Paolo Rapisarda and Jan C.Willems, 2006. Recent Developments in Behavioral System Theory, July 24–28, 2006, MTNS 2006, Kyoto, Japan
- J.C. Willems. Terminals and ports. IEEE Circuits and Systems Magazine Volume 10, issue 4, pages 8–16, December 2010
- J.C. Willems and H.L. Trentelman. On quadratic differential forms. SIAM Journal on Control and Optimization Volume 36, pages 1702-1749, 1998
- J.C. Willems. Paradigms and puzzles in the theory of dynamical systems. IEEE Transactions on Automatic Control Volume 36, pages 259-294, 1991
- J.C. Willems. Models for dynamics. Dynamics Reported Volume 2, pages 171-269, 1989
