= Integration using parametric derivatives =

Method which uses known Integrals to integrate derived functions

In calculus, integration by parametric derivatives, also called parametric integration, is a method which uses known integrals to integrate derived functions. It is often used in Physics, and is similar to integration by substitution.

== Statement of the theorem ==
By using the Leibniz integral rule with the upper and lower bounds fixed we get that
$\frac{d}{dt}\left(\int_a^b f(x,t)dx\right)=\int_a^b \frac{\partial}{\partial t} f(x,t)dx$
It is also true for non-finite bounds.

== Examples ==
=== Example One: Exponential Integral ===
For example, suppose we want to find the integral

$$\int_0^\infty x^2 e^{-3x} \, dx.$$

Since this is a product of two functions that are simple to integrate separately, repeated integration by parts is certainly one way to evaluate it. However, we may also evaluate this by starting with a simpler integral and an added parameter, which in this case is t = 3:

$$\begin{align}
& \int_0^\infty e^{-tx} \, dx = \left[ \frac{e^{-tx}}{-t} \right]_0^\infty = \left( \lim_{x \to \infty} \frac{e^{-tx}}{-t} \right) - \left( \frac{e^{-t0}}{-t} \right) \\
& =  0 - \left( \frac{1}{-t} \right) = \frac{1}{t}.
\end{align}$$

This converges only for t > 0, which is true of the desired integral. Now that we know

$$\int_0^\infty e^{-tx} \, dx = \frac{1}{t},$$

we can differentiate both sides twice with respect to t (not x) in order to add the factor of x^{2} in the original integral.

$$\begin{align}
& \frac{d^2}{dt^2} \int_0^\infty e^{-tx} \, dx = \frac{d^2}{dt^2} \frac{1}{t} \\[10pt]
& \int_0^\infty \frac{d^2}{dt^2} e^{-tx} \, dx = \frac{d^2}{dt^2} \frac{1}{t} \\[10pt]
& \int_0^\infty \frac{d}{dt} \left (-x e^{-tx}\right) \, dx = \frac{d}{dt} \left(-\frac{1}{t^2}\right) \\[10pt]
& \int_0^\infty x^2 e^{-tx} \, dx = \frac{2}{t^3}.
\end{align}$$

This is the same form as the desired integral, where t = 3. Substituting that into the above equation gives the value:

$$\int_0^\infty x^2 e^{-3x} \, dx = \frac{2}{3^3} = \frac{2}{27}.$$

=== Example Two: Gaussian Integral ===
Starting with the integral $\int^\infty_{-\infty} e^{-x^2t}dx=\frac{\sqrt\pi}{\sqrt t}$, taking the derivative with respect to t on both sides yields
$$\begin{align}
&\frac{d}{dt}\int^\infty_{-\infty} e^{-x^2t}dx=\frac{d}{dt}\frac{\sqrt\pi}{\sqrt t}\\
&-\int^\infty_{-\infty} x^2 e^{-x^2t} = -\frac{\sqrt \pi}{2}t^{-\frac{3}{2}}\\
&\int^\infty_{-\infty} x^2e^{-x^2t}= \frac{\sqrt{\pi}}{2}t^{-\frac{3}{2}}
\end{align}$$.
In general, taking the n-th derivative with respect to t gives us
$\int^\infty_{-\infty} x^{2n}e^{-x^2t}= \frac{(2n-1)!!\sqrt \pi}{2^n}t^{-\frac{2n+1}{2}}$.

=== Example Three: A Polynomial ===
Using the classical $\int x^t dx=\frac{x^{t+1}}{t+1}$ and taking the derivative with respect to t we get
$\int \ln(x)x^t= \frac{\ln(x)x^{t+1}}{t+1} - \frac{x^{t+1}}{(t+1)^2}$.

=== Example Four: Sums ===
The method can also be applied to sums, as exemplified below.
Use the Weierstrass factorization of the sinh function:
$\frac{\sinh (z)}{z}=\prod_{n=1}^\infty \left(\frac{\pi^2 n^2 + z^2}{\pi^2 n^2}\right)$.
Take the logarithm:
$\ln(\sinh (z)) - \ln(z)=\sum_{n=1}^\infty \ln\left(\frac{\pi^2 n^2 + z^2}{\pi^2 n^2}\right)$.
Derive with respect to z:
$\coth(z) - \frac{1}{z}= \sum^\infty_{n=1}\frac{2z}{z^2+\pi^2n^2}$.
Let $w=\frac{z}{\pi}$:
$\frac{1}{2}\frac{\coth(\pi w)}{\pi w} - \frac{1}{2}\frac{1}{z^2}=\sum^\infty_{n=1}\frac{1}{n^2+w^2}$.
