= Unimodular =

In mathematics, unimodular may refer to any of the following:

- Unimodular lattice
- Unimodular matrix
- Unimodular polynomial matrix
- Unimodular form
- Unimodular group
