= Exponential type =

Type of complex function with growth bounded by an exponential function

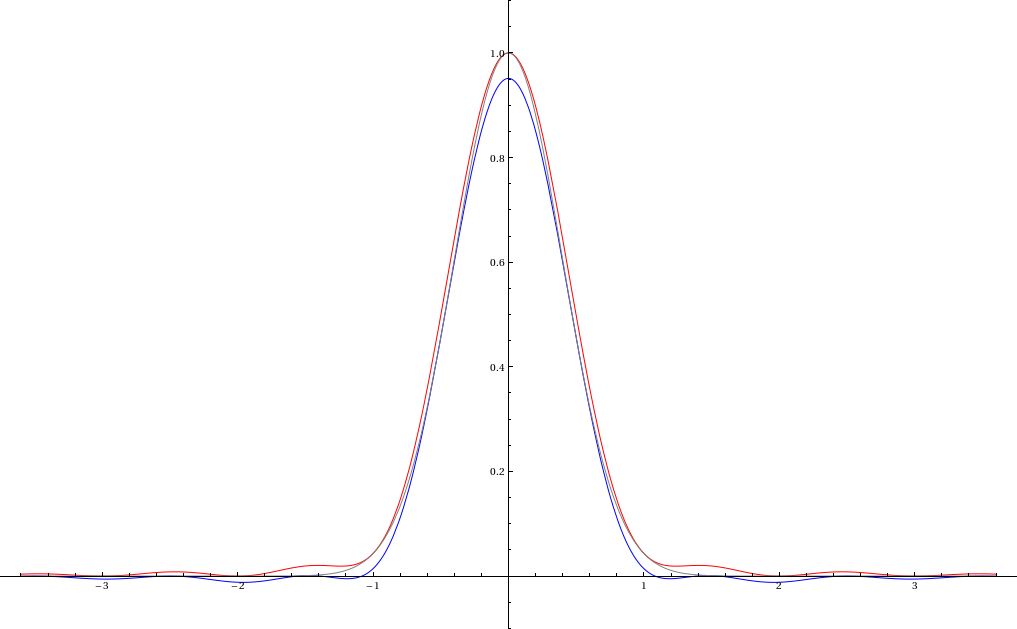
The graph of the function in gray is $e^{-\pi z^{2}}$, the Gaussian restricted to the real axis. The Gaussian does not have exponential type, but the functions in red and blue are one sided approximations that have exponential type $2\pi$.

In complex analysis, a branch of mathematics, a holomorphic function is said to be of exponential type C if its growth is bounded by the exponential function $e^{C|z|}$ for some real-valued constant $C$ as $|z|\to\infty$. When a function is bounded in this way, it is then possible to express it as certain kinds of convergent summations over a series of other complex functions, as well as understanding when it is possible to apply techniques such as Borel summation, or, for example, to apply the Mellin transform, or to perform approximations using the Euler–Maclaurin formula. The general case is handled by Nachbin's theorem, which defines the analogous notion of $\Psi$-type for a general function $\Psi(z)$ as opposed to $e^z$.

== Basic idea ==
A function $f(z)$ defined on the complex plane is said to be of exponential type if there exist real-valued constants $M$ and $\tau$ such that

$$\left|f\left(re^{i\theta}\right)\right| \le Me^{\tau r}$$

in the limit of $r\to\infty$. Here, the complex variable $z$ was written as $z=re^{i\theta}$ to emphasize that the limit must hold in all directions $\theta$. Letting $\tau$ stand for the infimum of all such $\tau$, one then says that the function $f$ is of exponential type $\tau$.

For example, let $f(z)=\sin(\pi z)$. Then one says that $\sin(\pi z)$ is of exponential type $\pi$, since $\pi$ is the smallest number that bounds the growth of $\sin(\pi z)$ along the imaginary axis. So, for this example, Carlson's theorem cannot apply, as it requires functions of exponential type less than $\pi$. Similarly, the Euler–Maclaurin formula cannot be applied either, as it, too, expresses a theorem ultimately anchored in the theory of finite differences.

== Formal definition ==
A holomorphic function $F(z)$ is said to be of exponential type $\sigma>0$ if for every $\varepsilon>0$ there exists a real-valued constant $A_\varepsilon$ such that

$$|F(z)|\leq A_\varepsilon e^{(\sigma+\varepsilon)|z|}$$

for $|z|\to\infty$ where $z\in\mathbb{C}$. We say $F(z)$ is of exponential type if $F(z)$ is of exponential type $\sigma$ for some $\sigma>0$. The number

$$\tau(F)=\sigma=\displaystyle\limsup_{|z|\rightarrow\infty}|z|^{-1}\log|F(z)|$$

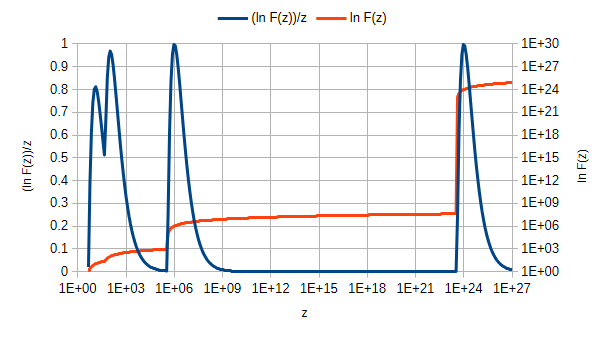
Behavior of $F(z)=\sum_{n=1}^\infty\frac{z^{10^{n!}}}{(10^{n!})!}.$ The ratio of $\log|F(z)|$ to $|z|$ at a given radius is maximized on the real axis.

is the exponential type of $F(z)$. The limit superior here means the limit of the supremum of the ratio outside a given radius as the radius goes to infinity. This is also the limit superior of the maximum of the ratio at a given radius as the radius goes to infinity. The limit superior may exist even if the maximum at radius $r$ does not have a limit as $r$ goes to infinity. For example, for the function

$$F(z)=\sum_{n=1}^\infty\frac{z^{10^{n!}}}{(10^{n!})!}$$

the value of

$$(\max_{|z|=r} \log|F(z)|) / r$$

at $r=10^{n!-1}$ is dominated by the n−1^{st} term and this goes to zero as $n$ goes to infinity, but $F(z)$ is nevertheless of exponential type 1, as can be seen by looking at the points $z=10^{n!}$.

== Exponential type with respect to a symmetric convex body ==
Stein (1957) has given a generalization of exponential type for entire functions of several complex variables. Suppose $K$ is a convex, compact, and symmetric subset of $\mathbb{R}^n$. It is known that for every such $K$ there is an associated norm $\|\cdot\|_K$ with the property that

$$K=\{x\in\mathbb{R}^n : \|x\|_K \leq1\}.$$

In other words, $K$ is the unit ball in $\mathbb{R}^{n}$ with respect to $\|\cdot\|_K$. The set

$$K^{*}=\{y\in\mathbb{R}^{n}:x\cdot y \leq 1 \text{ for all }x\in{K}\}$$

is called the polar set and is also a convex, compact, and symmetric subset of $\mathbb{R}^n$. Furthermore, we can write

$$\|x\|_K = \displaystyle\sup_{y\in K^{*}}|x\cdot y|.$$

We extend $\|\cdot\|_K$ from $\mathbb{R}^n$ to $\mathbb{C}^n$ by

$$\|z\|_K = \displaystyle\sup_{y\in K^{*}}|z\cdot y|.$$

An entire function $F(z)$ of $n$-complex variables is said to be of exponential type with respect to $K$ if for every $\varepsilon>0$ there exists a real-valued constant $A_\varepsilon$ such that

$$|F(z)|<A_\varepsilon e^{2\pi(1+\varepsilon)\|z\|_K}$$

for all $z\in\mathbb{C}^{n}$.

== Fréchet space ==
Collections of functions of exponential type $\tau$ can form a complete uniform space, namely a Fréchet space, by the topology induced by the countable family of norms

$$\|f\|_n = \sup_{z \in \mathbb{C}} \exp \left[-\left(\tau + \frac{1}{n}\right)|z|\right]|f(z)|.$$

== See also ==
- Paley–Wiener theorem
- Paley–Wiener space
