= Johan Jensen (mathematician) =

Danish mathematician and engineer (1859–1925)

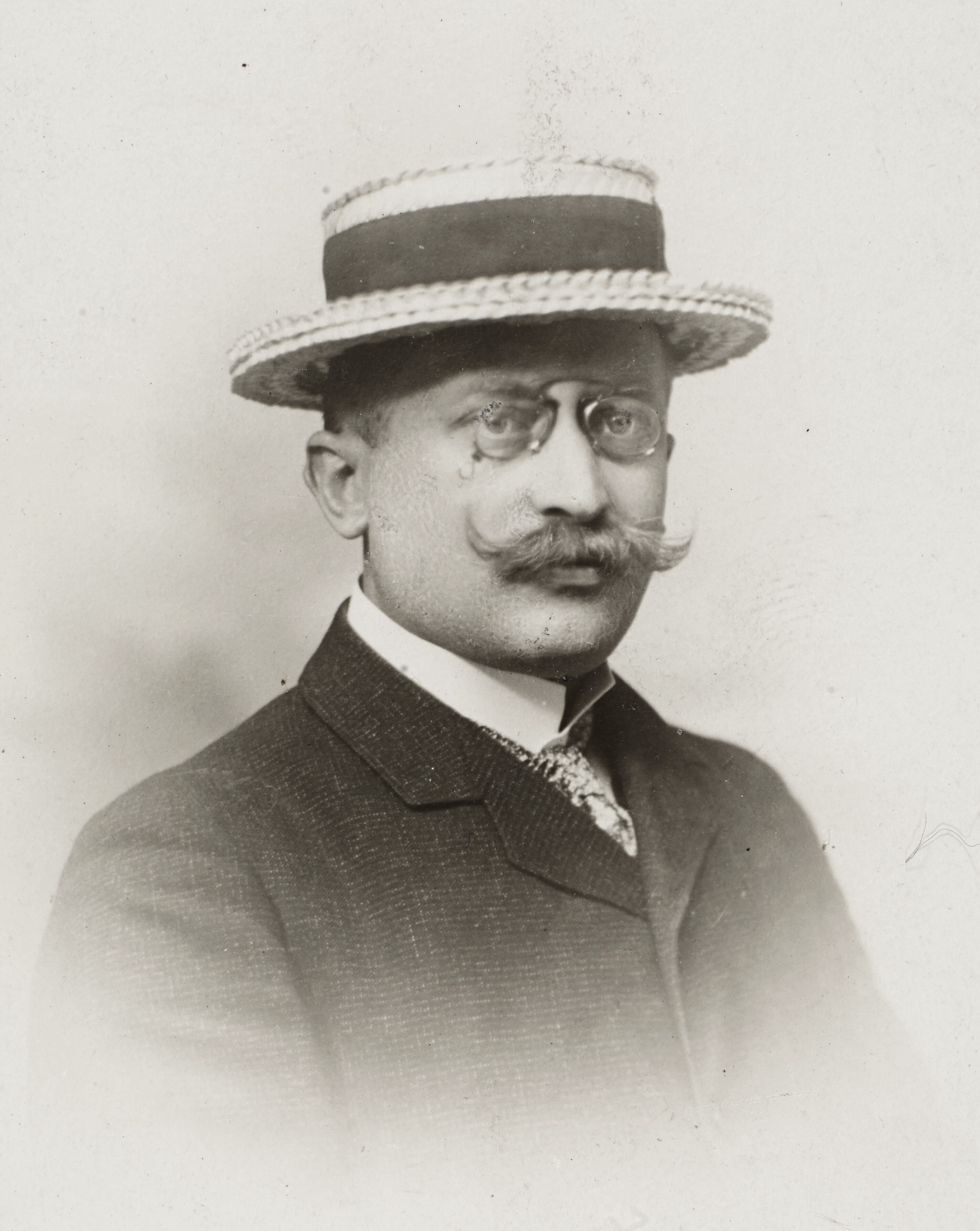
- Born: Johan Ludvig William Valdemar Jensen; May 8, 1859; Nakskov, Denmark
- Died: March 5, 1925 (aged 65); Copenhagen, Denmark
- Education: College of Technology
- Known for: Jensen's inequality Jensen's formula
- Scientific career
- Fields: Mathematics, Telecommunications
- Workplaces: International Bell Telephone Company

Johan Ludwig William Valdemar Jensen (8 May 1859 – 5 March 1925), mostly known as Johan Jensen, was a Danish mathematician and engineer. He was the president of the Danish Mathematical Society from 1892 to 1903.

== Biography ==
Jensen was born in Nakskov, Denmark, but spent much of his childhood in northern Sweden, because his father obtained a job there as the manager of an estate. Their family returned to Denmark before 1876, when Jensen enrolled to the College of Advanced Technology. Although he studied mathematics among various subjects at college, and even published a research paper in mathematics, he learned advanced maths topics later by himself and never held any academic position. Instead, he was a successful engineer for the Copenhagen Telephone Company between 1881 and 1924, and became head of the technical department in 1890. All his mathematics research was carried out in his spare time. Jensen is mostly renowned for his famous inequality, Jensen's inequality. In 1915, Jensen also proved Jensen's formula in complex analysis.

== See also ==
- Jensen–Shannon divergence
