= Regular part =

(of a Laurent series) consists of the series of terms with positive powers

In mathematics, the regular part of a Laurent series consists of the series of terms with positive powers. That is, if

$$f(z) = \sum_{n=-\infty}^{\infty} a_n (z - c)^n,$$

then the regular part of this Laurent series is

$$\sum_{n=0}^{\infty} a_n (z - c)^n.$$

In contrast, the series of terms with negative powers is the principal part.
