= Matsaev's theorem =

Theorem about entire functions

Matsaev's theorem is a theorem from complex analysis, which characterizes the order and type of an entire function.

The theorem was proven in 1960 by Vladimir Igorevich Matsaev.

== Matsaev's theorem ==
Let $f(z)$ with $z=re^{i\theta}$ be an entire function which is bounded from below as follows

$$\log(|f(z)|)\geq -C\frac{r^{\rho}}{|\sin(\theta)|^s},$$

where

$C>0,\quad \rho>1\quad$ and $\quad s\geq 0.$

Then $f$ is of order $\rho$ and has finite type.
