= Jensen's formula =

Mathematical formula in complex analysis

In complex analysis, Jensen's formula relates the average magnitude of an analytic function on a circle with the number of its zeros inside the circle. The formula was introduced by Johan Jensen (1899) and forms an important statement in the study of entire functions.

== Formal statement ==
Suppose that $f$ is an analytic function in a region in the complex plane $\mathbb{C}$ which contains the closed disk $\mathbb{D}_r$ of radius $r>0$ about the origin, $a_1,a_2,\ldots,a_n$ are the zeros of $f$ in the interior of $\mathbb{D}_r$ (repeated according to their respective multiplicity), and that $f(0)\neq 0$.

Jensen's formula states that

$$\log |f(0)| = -\sum_{k=1}^n \log \left( \frac{r}{|a_k|}\right) + \frac{1}{2\pi} \int_0^{2\pi} \log|f(re^{i\theta})| \, d\theta.$$

This formula establishes a connection between the moduli of the zeros of $f$ in the interior of $\mathbb{D}_r$ and the average of $\log|f(z)|$ on the boundary circle $|z|=r$, and can be seen as a generalisation of the mean value property of harmonic functions. Namely, if $f$ has no zeros in $\mathbb{D}_r$, then Jensen's formula reduces to

$$\log |f(0)| = \frac{1}{2\pi} \int_0^{2\pi} \log|f(re^{i\theta})| \, d\theta,$$

which is the mean-value property of the harmonic function $\log |f(z)|$.

An equivalent statement of Jensen's formula that is frequently used is

$$\frac{1}{2\pi} \int_0^{2\pi} \log |f(re^{i\theta})| \, d\theta - \log |f(0)| = \int_0^r \frac{n(t)}{t} \, dt$$

where $n(t)$ denotes the number of zeros of $f$ in the disc of radius $t$ centered at the origin.

Proof

It suffices to prove the case for $r=1$.

1. If $f$ contains zeros on the circle boundary, then we can define $g(z) = \frac{f(z)}{\prod_k (z-e^{i\theta_k})}$, where $e^{i\theta_k}$ are the zeros on the circle boundary. Since
  $$\int_0^{2\pi} \ln|e^{i\theta} -e^{i\theta_k}| d\theta = 2\int_0^\pi \ln(2\sin \theta)d\theta= 0,$$
  we have reduced to proving the theorem for $g$, that is, the case with no zeros on the circle boundary.
2. Define
  $$F(z) := \frac{f(z)}{\prod_{k=1}^n(z-a_k)}$$
  and fill in all the removable singularities. We obtain a function $F$ that is analytic in $B(0, 1+\epsilon)$, and it has no roots in $B(0, 1)$.
3. Since $\log |F| = Re(\log F)$ is a harmonic function, we can apply Poisson integral formula to it, and obtain
  $$\log |F(0)|=\frac{1}{2 \pi} \int_0^{2 \pi} \log |F(e^{i \theta})|\, d \theta
= \frac{1}{2\pi} \int_0^{2\pi} \log|f(e^{i\theta})| \, d\theta -\sum_{k=1}^n \frac{1}{2\pi} \int_0^{2\pi} \log |e^{i\theta} - a_k| \, d\theta.$$
  where $\int_0^{2\pi} \log|e^{i\theta} - a_k| \, d\theta$ can be written as
  $$\int_0^{2\pi} \log|e^{i\theta} - a_k| \, d\theta
= \int_0^{2\pi} \log|1 - a_ke^{-i\theta}| \, d\theta = Re \int_0^{2\pi} \log(1 - a_ke^{-i\theta}) \, d\theta.$$
4. Now, $\int_0^{2\pi} \log(1 - a_ke^{-i\theta}) \, d\theta$ is a multiple of a contour integral of function $\log (1-z)/z$ along a circle of radius $|a_k| < 1$. Since $\log(1-z)/z$ has no poles in $B(0, |a_k|)$, the contour integral is zero.

== Applications ==
Jensen's formula can be used to estimate the number of zeros of an analytic function in a disk. Namely, if $f$ is a function analytic in a disk of radius $R$ centered at $z_0$ and if $| f |$ is bounded by $M$ on the boundary of that disk, then the number of zeros of $f$ in a disk of radius $r<R$ centered at the same point $z_0$ does not exceed

$$\frac{1}{\log (R/r)} \log \frac{M}{|f(z_0)|}.$$

Jensen's formula is an important statement in the study of value distribution of entire and meromorphic functions. In particular, it is the starting point of Nevanlinna theory, and it often appears in proofs of Hadamard factorization theorem, which requires an estimate on the number of zeros of an entire function.

Jensen's formula is also used to prove a generalization of Paley-Wiener theorem for quasi-analytic functions with $r \rightarrow 1$. In the field of control theory (in particular: spectral factorization methods) this generalization is often referred to as the Paley–Wiener condition.

== Generalizations ==
Jensen's formula may be generalized for functions which are merely meromorphic on $\mathbb{D}_r$. Namely, assume that

$$f(z)=z^l \frac{g(z)}{h(z)},$$

where $g$ and $h$ are analytic functions in $\mathbb{D}_r$ having zeros at $a_1,\ldots,a_n \in \mathbb{D}_r\setminus\{0\}$ and $b_1,\ldots,b_m \in \mathbb{D}_r\setminus\{0\}$ respectively, then Jensen's formula for meromorphic functions states that

$$\log \left|\frac{g(0)}{h(0)}\right| = \log \left |r^{m-n-l} \frac{a_1\ldots a_n}{b_1\ldots b_m}\right| + \frac{1}{2\pi} \int_0^{2\pi} \log|f(re^{i\theta})| \, d\theta.$$

Jensen's formula is a consequence of the more general Poisson–Jensen formula, which in turn follows from Jensen's formula by applying a Möbius transformation to $z$. It was introduced and named by Rolf Nevanlinna. If $f$ is a function which is analytic in the unit disk, with zeros $a_1,a_2,\ldots,a_n$ located in the interior of the unit disk, then for every $z_0=r_0e^{i\varphi_0}$ in the unit disk the Poisson–Jensen formula states that

$$\log |f(z_0)| = \sum_{k=1}^n \log \left|\frac{z_0-a_k}{1-\bar {a}_k z_0} \right| + \frac{1}{2\pi} \int_0^{2\pi} P_{r_0}(\varphi_0-\theta) \log |f(e^{i\theta})| \, d\theta.$$

Here,

$$P_{r}(\omega)= \sum_{n\in\mathbb{Z}} r^{|n|} e^{i n\omega}$$

is the Poisson kernel on the unit disk. If the function $f$ has no zeros in the unit disk, the Poisson-Jensen formula reduces to

$$\log |f(z_0)| = \frac{1}{2\pi} \int_0^{2\pi} P_{r_0}(\varphi_0-\theta) \log |f(e^{i\theta})| \, d\theta,$$

which is the Poisson formula for the harmonic function $\log |f(z)|$.

== See also ==
- Paley–Wiener theorem

== Sources ==
- Ahlfors, Lars V. (1979), Complex analysis. An introduction to the theory of analytic functions of one complex variable, International Series in pure and applied Mathematics (3rd ed.), Düsseldorf: McGraw–Hill, ISBN 0-07-000657-1, Zbl 0395.30001
- Jensen, J. (1899), "Sur un nouvel et important théorème de la théorie des fonctions", Acta Mathematica (in French), 22 (1): 359–364, doi:10.1007/BF02417878, ISSN 0001-5962, JFM 30.0364.02, MR 1554908
- Paley, Raymond E. A. C.; Wiener, Norbert (1934). Fourier Transforms in the Complex Domain. Providence, RI: American Mathematical Soc. ISBN 978-0-8218-1019-4.
- Ransford, Thomas (1995), Potential theory in the complex plane, London Mathematical Society Student Texts, vol. 28, Cambridge: Cambridge University Press, ISBN 0-521-46654-7, Zbl 0828.31001
- Sayed, A. H.; Kailath, T. (2001). "A survey of spectral factorization methods". Numerical Linear Algebra with Applications. 8 (6–7): 467–496. doi:10.1002/nla.250. ISSN 1070-5325.
