= Unimodular polynomial matrix =

Square polynomial matrix in mathematics

In mathematics, a unimodular polynomial matrix is a square polynomial matrix whose inverse exists and is itself a polynomial matrix. Equivalently, a polynomial matrix A is unimodular if its determinant det(A) is a nonzero constant.

== Other sources & external links ==
- Antsaklis, Panos J.; Michel, Anthony N. (2006), A Linear Systems Primer, p. 273, ISBN 978-0-8176-4460-4
- Polynomial matrix glossary at Polyx (A matlab toolbox)
