= Polynomial matrix spectral factorization =

Polynomial matrix spectral factorization or matrix Fejér–Riesz theorem is a tool used to study the matrix decomposition of polynomial matrices. Polynomial matrices are widely studied in the fields of systems theory and control theory and have seen other uses relating to stable polynomials. In stability theory, Spectral Factorization has been used to find determinantal matrix representations for bivariate stable polynomials and real zero polynomials.

Given a positive real trigonometric polynomial $p(t) > 0$ for all $t \in \mathbb{R}$, the Fejér–Riesz Theorem yields the factorization $p(t) = q(t)\bar{q}(t)$ called the spectral factorization (or Wiener-Hopf factorization) of $p(t)$. Results of this form are generically referred to as Positivstellensatz.

Likewise, the Polynomial Matrix Spectral Factorization provides a factorization for positive definite polynomial matrices. This decomposition also relates to the Cholesky decomposition for scalar matrices $A =LL^*$. This result was originally proven by Norbert Wiener in a more general context which was concerned with integrable matrix-valued functions that also had integrable log determinant. Because applications are often concerned with the polynomial restriction, simpler proofs and individual analysis exist focusing on this case. Weaker positivstellensatz conditions have been studied, specifically considering when the polynomial matrix has positive definite image on semi-algebraic subsets of the reals.

Spectral factorization is used extensively in linear–quadratic–Gaussian control and many algorithms exist to calculate spectral factors. Some modern algorithms focus on the more general setting originally studied by Wiener while others have used Toeplitz matrix advances to speed up factor calculations.

== Definition ==
Consider the $n \times n$ polynomial matrix
$$P(x) = \sum_{k=0}^N P_{k}x^{k} = \begin{bmatrix}p_{11}(x) &\ldots &p_{1n}(x) \\ \vdots & \ddots & \vdots\\ p_{n1}(x) & \cdots& p_{nn}(x)\\  \end{bmatrix},$$
where each element $p_{ij}(x)$ is a complex polynomial of at most $N$-degree. If $P(x)$ is a positive semi-definite matrix for all $x \in \mathbb{R}$, then there exists an $n \times n$ polynomial matrix $Q(x)$ with complex polynomials $q_{ij}(x)$ such that
$$P(x) = Q(x) Q^*(x),$$
where $Q^*(x)$ is the conjugate transpose. When the elements of $Q(x)$ are complex polynomials or complex coefficient rational functions then so are the elements of its conjugate transpose.

We can furthermore find $Q(x)$ which is nonsingular on the lower half plane.

== Rational spectral factorization ==
Let $p(t)$ be a rational function where $p(t) > 0$ for all $t \in \mathbb{R}$. Then there exists a rational function $q(t)$ such that $p(t) = q(t)\bar{q}(t)$ and $q(t)$ has no poles or zeroes in the lower half plane. This decomposition is unique up to multiplication by complex scalars of norm $1$.

To prove existence write
$$p(x) = c \frac{\prod_i (x- \alpha_i)}{\prod_j (x-\beta_j)},$$
where $\alpha_i \neq \beta_j$. Letting $x \to \infty$, we can conclude that $c$ is real and positive. Dividing out by $\sqrt{c}$ we reduce to the monic case. The numerator and denominator have distinct sets of roots, so all real roots which show up in either must have even multiplicity (to prevent a sign change locally). We can divide out these real roots to reduce to the case where $p(t)$ has only complex roots and poles. By hypothesis we have
$$p(x) = \frac{\prod_i (x- \alpha_i)}{\prod_j (x-\beta_j)} = \frac{\prod_i (x- \bar{\alpha}_i)}{\prod_j (x-\bar{\beta}_j)} = \overline{p(x)}.$$
Since all of the $\alpha_i, \beta_j$are complex (and hence not fixed points of conjugation) they both come in conjugate pairs. For each conjugate pair, pick the zero or pole in the upper half plane and accumulate these to obtain $q(t)$. The uniqueness result follows in a standard fashion.

== Cholesky decomposition ==
The inspiration for this result is a factorization which characterizes positive definite matrices.

=== Decomposition for scalar matrices ===
Given any positive definite scalar matrix $A$, the Cholesky decomposition allows us to write $A = LL^*$ where $L$ is a lower triangular matrix. If we don't restrict to lower triangular matrices we can consider all factorizations of the form $A = V V^*$. It is not hard to check that all factorizations are achieved by looking at the orbit of $L$ under right multiplication by a unitary matrix, $V = L U$.

To obtain the lower triangular decomposition we induct by splitting off the first row and first column:
$$\begin{bmatrix} a_{11} & \mathbf{a}_{12}^* \\ \mathbf{a}_{12} & A_{22} \\ \end{bmatrix} = \begin{bmatrix} l_{11} & 0 \\ \mathbf{l}_{21} & L_{22} \end{bmatrix}  \begin{bmatrix} l_{11}^* & \mathbf{l}_{21}^* \\ 0 & L_{22}^* \end{bmatrix}  = \begin{bmatrix} l_{11} l_{11}^* & l_{11} \mathbf{l}_{21}^* \\ l_{11}^* \mathbf{l}_{21} & \mathbf{l}_{21} \mathbf{l}_{21}^*+  L_{22} L_{22}^* \end{bmatrix}$$
Solving these in terms of $a_{ij}$ we get
$$l_{11} = \sqrt{a_{11}}$$
$$\mathbf{l}_{21} = \frac{1}{\sqrt{a_{11}}}\mathbf{a}_{12}$$
$$L_{22} L_{22}^* = A_{22} - \frac{1}{a_{11}} \mathbf{a}_{12} \mathbf{a}^*_{12}$$

Since $A$ is positive definite we have $a_{11}$is a positive real number, so it has a square root. The last condition from induction since the right hand side is the Schur complement of $A$, which is itself positive definite.

=== Decomposition for rational polynomial matrices ===
A rational polynomial matrix is defined as a matrix
$$P(t) = \begin{bmatrix}p_{11}(t) &\ldots &p_{1n}(t) \\ \vdots & \ddots & \vdots\\ p_{n1}(t) & \cdots& p_{nn}(t)\\  \end{bmatrix},$$
where each entry $p_{ij}(t)$ is a complex rational function. If $P(t)$ is a positive definite Hermitian matrix for all $t\in\mathbb{R}$, then by the symmetric Gaussian elimination we performed above, all we need to show is there exists a rational $q_{11}(t)$ such that $p_{11}(t) = q_{11}(t) q_{11}(t)^*$, which follows from our rational spectral factorization. Once we have that then we can solve for $l_{11}(t), \mathbf{l}_{21}(t)$. Since the Schur complement is positive definite for the real $t$ away from the poles and the Schur complement is a rational polynomial matrix we can induct to find $L_{22}$.

It is not hard to check that we get $P(t) = L(t) L(t)^*$where $L(t)$ is a rational polynomial matrix with no poles in the lower half plane.

== Extension to polynomial decompositions ==
One way to prove the existence of polynomial matrix spectral factorization is to apply the Cholesky decomposition to a rational polynomial matrix and modify it to remove lower half plane singularities. That is, given
$$P(t) = \begin{bmatrix}p_{11}(t) &\ldots &p_{1n}(t) \\ \vdots & \ddots & \vdots\\ p_{n1}(t) & \cdots& p_{nn}(t)\\  \end{bmatrix},$$
where each entry $p_{ij}(t)$ is a complex coefficient polynomial for all $t\in\mathbb{R}$, a rational polynomial matrix $L(t)$ with no lower half plane poles exists such that $P(t) = L(t) L(t)^*$. Given a rational polynomial matrix $U(t)$ which is unitary valued for real $t$, there exists another decomposition
$$P(t) = L(t) L(t)^* = L(t) U(t)U(t)^*L(t)^*.$$
If $\det(L(a)) = 0$ then there exists a scalar unitary matrix $U$ such that
$$U e_1 = \frac{a}{|a|}.$$
This implies $L(t) U$ has first column vanish at $a$. To remove the singularity at $a$ we multiply by
$$U(t) = \operatorname{diag}(1, \ldots, \frac{z - \bar{a}}{z - a}, \ldots, 1)$$
$L(t) U U(t)$ has determinant with one less zero (by multiplicity) at a, without introducing any poles in the lower half plane of any of the entries.

=== Example ===
Consider the following rational matrix decomposition
$$A(t) = \begin{bmatrix} t^2 + 1 & 2 t \\ 2 t & t^2 + 1 \\ \end{bmatrix} = \begin{bmatrix} t - i & 0  \\ \frac{2t}{t + i} & \frac{t^2 - 1}{t + i} \\ \end{bmatrix}  \begin{bmatrix} t + i & \frac{2t}{t - i}  \\ 0 & \frac{t^2 - 1}{t - i} \\ \end{bmatrix}.$$
This decomposition has no poles in the upper half plane. However
$$\det\left(\begin{bmatrix} t - i & 0  \\ \frac{2t}{t + i} & \frac{t^2 - 1}{t + i} \\ \end{bmatrix}\right)=\frac{(t-1) (t-i) (t+1)}{t+i},$$
so we need to modify our decomposition to get rid of the singularity at $-i$. First we multiply by a scalar unitary matrix
$$U =\frac{1}{\sqrt{2}} \begin{bmatrix}1 & 1 \\ i & -i \\ \end{bmatrix},$$
such that
$$\begin{bmatrix} t - i & 0  \\ \frac{2t}{t + i} & \frac{t^2 - 1}{t + i} \\ \end{bmatrix} U = \frac{1}{\sqrt{2}}\begin{bmatrix} t-i & t - i \\ i \frac{(t-i)^2}{t+i} & -i(t+i) \\ \end{bmatrix},$$
becomes a new candidate for our decomposition. Now the first column vanishes at $t=i$, so we multiply through (on the right) by
$$U(t)  =\frac{1}{\sqrt{2}} \begin{bmatrix}\frac{t+i}{t-i} & 0 \\ 0 & 1\end{bmatrix},$$
to obtain
$$Q(t) = \frac{1}{\sqrt{2}}\begin{bmatrix} t-i & t - i \\ i \frac{(t-i)^2}{t+i} & -i(t+i) \\ \end{bmatrix} U(t) = \frac{1}{2}\begin{bmatrix} t + i & t - i \\ i(t-i) & -i(t+i) \\ \end{bmatrix},$$
where
$$\det(Q(t)) = i(1-t^2).$$
This is our desired decomposition $A(t) = Q(t) Q(t)^*$ with no singularities in the lower half plane.

=== Extend analyticity to all of C ===
After modifications, the decomposition $P(t)=Q(t) Q(t)^*$satisfies $Q(t)$ is holomorphic and invertible on the lower half plane. To extend analyticity to the upper half plane we need this key observation: If an invertible rational matrix $Q(t)$ is holomorphic in the lower half plane, $Q(t)^{-1}$ is holomorphic in the lower half plane as well. The analyticity follows from the adjugate matrix formula (since both the entries of $Q(t)$ and $\det(Q(t))^{-1}$are analytic on the lower half plane). The determinant of a rational polynomial matrix can only have poles where its entries have poles, so $\det(Q(t))$ has no poles in the lower half plane.

Subsequently,
$$Q(t)=(P(t)Q(t)^{-1})^*.$$
Since $Q(t)^{-1}$ is analytic on the lower half plane, $Q(t)$ is analytic on the upper half plane. Finally if $Q(t)$ has a pole on the real line then $Q(t)^*$ has the same pole on the real line which contradicts the hypothesis that $P(t)$ has no poles on the real line (i.e. it is analytic everywhere).

The above shows that if $Q(t)$ is analytic and invertible on the lower half plane indeed $Q(t)$ is analytic everywhere and hence a polynomial matrix.

== See also ==
- Matrix factorization of a polynomial
