= Hadamard factorization theorem =

Statement in complex analysis

In mathematics, and particularly in the field of complex analysis, the Hadamard factorization theorem asserts that every entire function with finite order can be represented as a product involving its zeroes and an exponential of a polynomial. It is named for Jacques Hadamard.

The theorem may be viewed as an extension of the fundamental theorem of algebra, which asserts that every polynomial may be factored into linear factors, one for each root. It is closely related to Weierstrass factorization theorem, which does not restrict to entire functions with finite orders.

== Formal statement ==
Define the Hadamard canonical factors
$$E_n(z) := (1-z) \prod_{k=1}^n e^{z^k/k}$$
Entire functions of finite order $\rho$ have Hadamard's canonical representation:
$$f(z)=z^me^{Q(z)}\prod_{n=1}^\infty E_p(z/a_n)$$
where $a_k$ are those roots of $f$ that are not zero ($a_k \neq 0$), $m$ is the order of the zero of $f$ at $z = 0$ (the case $m = 0$ being taken to mean $f(0) \neq 0$), $Q$ a polynomial (whose degree we shall call $q$), and $p$ is the smallest non-negative integer such that the series
$$\sum_{n=1}^\infty\frac{1}{|a_n|^{p+1}}$$
converges. The non-negative integer $g=\max\{p,q\}$ is called the genus of the entire function $f$. In this notation,
$$g \leq \rho \leq g + 1$$
In other words: If the order $\rho$ is not an integer, then $g = [ \rho ]$ is the integer part of $\rho$. If the order is a positive integer, then there are two possibilities: $g = \rho-1$ or $g = \rho$.

For example, $\sin$, $\cos$ and $\exp$ are entire functions of genus $g = \rho = 1$.

== Convergence exponent ==
Define the convergence exponent of the roots of $f$ as the following:
$$\alpha := \limsup_{r\to\infty} \frac{\log N(f, r)}{\log r}$$
where $N(f, r)$ is the number of roots with modulus $< r$. In other words, we have an asymptotic bound on the growth behavior of the number of roots of the function:
$$\forall \epsilon > 0\quad N(f, r) \ll r^{\alpha + \epsilon}, \text{ and exists a sequence }r_k\text{ such that }  N(f, r_k) > r_k^{\alpha - \epsilon}$$
It's clear that $\alpha\geq 0$.

Theorem: If $f$ is an entire function with infinitely many roots, then
$$\alpha = \inf\left\{\beta : \sum_k |a_k|^{-\beta} < \infty\right\} = \limsup_{k\to\infty} \frac{\log k}{\log |a_k|}$$
Note: These two equalities are purely about the limit behaviors of a real number sequence $|a_1| \leq |a_2| \leq \cdots$ that diverges to infinity. It does not involve complex analysis.

Proposition: $\alpha(f) \leq \rho$, by Jensen's formula.

== Applications ==
With Hadamard factorization we can prove some special cases of Picard's little theorem.

Theorem: If $f$ is entire, nonconstant, and has finite order, then it assumes either the whole complex plane or the plane minus a single point.

Proof: If $f$ does not assume value $z_0$, then by Hadamard factorization, $f(z) - z_0 = e^{Q(z)}$ for a nonconstant polynomial $Q$. By the fundamental theorem of algebra, $Q$ assumes all values, so $f(z) - z_0$ assumes all nonzero values.

Theorem: If $f$ is entire, nonconstant, and has finite, non-integer order $\rho$, then it assumes the whole complex plane infinitely many times.

Proof: For any $w\in \mathbb C$, it suffices to prove $f(z) - w$ has infinitely many roots. Expand $f(z) - w$ to its Hadamard representation $f(z) - w = e^{Q(z)} z^m \prod_k E_p(z/a_k)$. If the product is finite, then $\rho = g$ is an integer.

== Proof ==
The proof below follows Conway's treatment of Hadamard's factorization theorem.

Let $f$ be an entire function of finite order $\rho$. If $f$ has a zero of order $m$ at the origin, write

$$f(z)=z^m f_0(z),$$

where $f_0$ is entire and $f_0(0)\ne 0$. Multiplying by a nonzero constant does not affect the order, so it is enough to prove the theorem under the normalization $f(0)=1$. The factor $z^m$ can then be restored at the end.

Let $a_1,a_2,\ldots$ be the nonzero zeros of $f$, repeated according to multiplicity and ordered so that

$$|a_1|\le |a_2|\le\cdots.$$

Let $p=\lfloor \rho\rfloor$. The first step is to show that the zero sequence has exponent of convergence at most $\rho$, and in particular that

$$\sum_{n=1}^{\infty}|a_n|^{-p-1}<\infty.$$

Indeed, let $n(r)$ denote the number of zeros of $f$ in $|z|<r$, counted with multiplicity. By Jensen's formula, one obtains an estimate of the form

$$n(r)\log 2\le \log M(2r),$$

where

$$M(r)=\max_{|z|=r}|f(z)|.$$

Since $f$ has order $\rho$, for every $\varepsilon>0$ and all sufficiently large $r$,

$$\log M(r)\le r^{\rho+\varepsilon}.$$

Choosing $\varepsilon>0$ so small that $\rho+\varepsilon<p+1$, it follows that

$$n(r)=O(r^{\rho+\varepsilon}).$$

Since $k\le n(|a_k|)$, this gives

$$|a_k|\ge C k^{1/(\rho+\varepsilon)}$$

for all sufficiently large $k$ and some constant $C>0$. Therefore

$$|a_k|^{-p-1}\le C' k^{-(p+1)/(\rho+\varepsilon)},$$

and the exponent on the right is greater than $1$. Hence

$$\sum_{n=1}^{\infty}|a_n|^{-p-1}<\infty.$$

Consequently the canonical product

$$P(z)=\prod_{n=1}^{\infty}E_p(z/a_n)$$

converges locally uniformly and defines an entire function whose zeros are precisely the zeros $a_n$, with the same multiplicities. Thus

$$F(z)=\frac{f(z)}{P(z)}$$

is a zero-free entire function. Since the complex plane is simply connected, there is an entire function $g$ such that

$$F(z)=e^{g(z)}.$$

Hence

$$f(z)=e^{g(z)}P(z).$$

It remains to prove that $g$ is a polynomial of degree at most $p$. For this Conway uses the following logarithmic-derivative lemma.

Lemma. If $f$ is an entire function of finite order $\rho$, $f(0)\ne0$, and $p$ is an integer with $p>\rho-1$, then, away from the zeros of $f$,

$$\frac{d^p}{dz^p}\left(\frac{f'(z)}{f(z)}\right)
=
-p!\sum_{n=1}^{\infty}\frac{1}{(a_n-z)^{p+1}}.$$

In the present case $p=\lfloor\rho\rfloor$, so $p>\rho-1$. Applying the lemma to $f$ gives

$$\frac{d^p}{dz^p}\left(\frac{f'(z)}{f(z)}\right)
=
-p!\sum_{n=1}^{\infty}\frac{1}{(a_n-z)^{p+1}}.$$

On the other hand, since $f=e^gP$,

$$\frac{f'}{f}=g'+\frac{P'}{P}.$$

For a single elementary factor,

$$\frac{d}{dz}\log E_p(z/a)
=
-\frac{1}{a-z}+\sum_{j=1}^{p}\frac{z^{j-1}}{a^j}.$$

After differentiating $p$ times, the polynomial part vanishes, and hence

$$\frac{d^p}{dz^p}\left(\frac{P'}{P}\right)
=
-p!\sum_{n=1}^{\infty}\frac{1}{(a_n-z)^{p+1}}.$$

Comparing the two formulas gives

$$g^{(p+1)}(z)=0.$$

Therefore $g$ is a polynomial of degree at most $p$.

Restoring the zero at the origin, one obtains

$$f(z)=z^m e^{Q(z)}\prod_{n=1}^{\infty}E_p(z/a_n),$$

where $Q$ is a polynomial of degree at most $p=\lfloor\rho\rfloor$. Thus the genus of $f$ is finite and is at most $\rho$. This is Hadamard's factorization theorem.
