= Matrix factorization of a polynomial =

Mathematical technique

In mathematics, a matrix factorization of a polynomial is a technique for factoring irreducible polynomials with matrices. David Eisenbud proved that every multivariate real-valued polynomial p without linear terms can be written as AB = pI, where A and B are square matrices and I is the identity matrix. Given the polynomial p, the matrices A and B can be found by elementary methods.

== Example ==
The polynomial x^{2} + y^{2} is irreducible over R[x,y], but can be written as

$$\left[\begin{array}{cc}
x & -y \\
y & x
\end{array}\right]\left[\begin{array}{cc}
x & y \\
-y & x
\end{array}\right] = (x^2 + y^2)
\left[\begin{array}{cc}
1 & 0 \\
0 & 1
\end{array}\right]$$
