= Norra Fågelås =

Coordinates: 58°16′N 14°16′E

Norra Fågelås is a village near Skara in Hjo Municipality (Hjo kommun), Sweden.
