= Göran Dillner =

Swedish mathematician

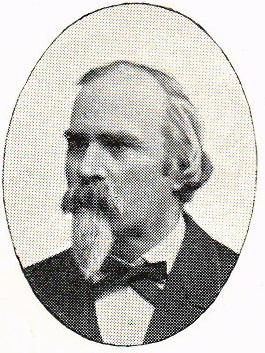
Göran Dillner SPA3

Göran Dillner (April 26, 1832 – March 28, 1906) was a Swedish mathematician.

He founded the Swedish Tidskrift för matematik och fysik (Journal of Mathematics and Physics), and was its editor-in-chief in 1868–1871 and 1874. He was a city councilor in Uppsala from 1875 to 1882.

== Works ==
- G. Dillner (1873) "Traité de calcul géométrique supérieur", Nova acta Regiae Societatis Scientiarum Upsaliensis, Ser. III 8. https://archive.org/details/novaactaregiaeso38kung/page/n590
