= Mittag-Leffler summation =

In mathematics, Mittag-Leffler summation is any of several variations of the Borel summation method for summing possibly divergent formal power series, introduced by Gösta Mittag-Leffler (1908)

== Definition ==
Let

$$y(z) = \sum_{k = 0}^\infty y_kz^k$$

be a formal power series in z.

Define the transform $\mathcal{B}_\alpha y$ of $y$ by

$$\mathcal{B}_\alpha y(t) \equiv \sum_{k=0}^\infty \frac{y_k}{\Gamma(1+\alpha k)}t^k$$

Then the Mittag-Leffler sum of y is given by

$$\lim_{\alpha\rightarrow 0}\mathcal{B}_\alpha y( z)$$

if each sum converges and the limit exists.

A closely related summation method, also called Mittag-Leffler summation, is given as follows (Sansone & Gerretsen 1960). Suppose that the Borel transform $\mathcal{B}_1 y(z)$ converges to an analytic function near 0 that can be analytically continued along the positive real axis to a function growing sufficiently slowly that the following integral is well defined (as an improper integral). Then the Mittag-Leffler sum of y is given by

$$\int_0^\infty e^{-t} \mathcal{B}_\alpha y(t^\alpha z) \, dt$$

When α = 1 this is the same as Borel summation.

== See also ==
- Mittag-Leffler distribution
- Mittag-Leffler function
- Nachbin's theorem
