= Principal part =

Widely-used term in mathematics

In mathematics, the principal part has several independent meanings but usually refers to the negative-power portion of the Laurent series of a function.

== Laurent series definition ==
The principal part at $z=a$ of a function

$$f(z) = \sum_{k=-\infty}^\infty a_k (z-a)^k$$

is the portion of the Laurent series consisting of terms with negative degree. That is,

$$\sum_{k=1}^\infty a_{-k} (z-a)^{-k}$$

is the principal part of $f$ at $a$. If the Laurent series has an inner radius of convergence of $0$, then $f(z)$ has an essential singularity at $a$ if and only if the principal part is an infinite sum. If the inner radius of convergence is not $0$, then $f(z)$ may be regular at $a$ despite the Laurent series having an infinite principal part.

== Other definitions ==
=== Calculus ===
Consider the difference between the function differential and the actual increment:

$$\frac{\Delta y}{\Delta x}=f'(x)+\varepsilon$$
$$\Delta y=f'(x)\Delta x +\varepsilon \Delta x = dy+\varepsilon \Delta x$$

The differential dy is sometimes called the principal (linear) part of the function increment Δy.

=== Distribution theory ===
The term principal part is also used for certain kinds of distributions having a singular support at a single point.

== See also ==
- Mittag-Leffler's theorem
- Cauchy principal value
