= Weierstrass factorization theorem =

Theorem in complex analysis

In mathematics, and particularly in the field of complex analysis, the Weierstrass factorization theorem asserts that every entire function can be represented as a (possibly infinite) product involving its zeroes. The theorem may be viewed as an extension of the fundamental theorem of algebra, which asserts that every polynomial may be factored into linear factors, one for each root.

The theorem, which is named for Karl Weierstrass, is closely related to a second result that every sequence tending to infinity has an associated entire function with zeroes at precisely the points of that sequence.

A generalization of the theorem extends it to meromorphic functions and allows one to consider a given meromorphic function as a product of three factors: terms depending on the function's zeros and poles, and an associated non-zero holomorphic function.

== Motivation ==
It is clear that any finite set $\{c_n\}$ of points in the complex plane has an associated polynomial $p(z) = \prod_n (z-c_n)$ whose zeroes are precisely at the points of that set. The converse is a consequence of the fundamental theorem of algebra: any polynomial function $p(z)$ in the complex plane has a factorization $p(z) = a\prod_n(z-c_n),$ where a is a non-zero constant and $\{c_n\}$ is the set of zeroes of $p(z)$.

The two forms of the Weierstrass factorization theorem can be thought of as extensions of the above to entire functions. The necessity of additional terms in the product is demonstrated when one considers $\prod_n (z-c_n)$ where the sequence $\{c_n\}$ is not finite. It can never define an entire function, because the infinite product does not converge. Thus one cannot, in general, define an entire function from a sequence of prescribed zeroes or represent an entire function by its zeroes using the expressions yielded by the fundamental theorem of algebra. Instead, the theorem replaces these with other factors.

A necessary condition for convergence of the infinite product in question is that for each $z$, the factors replacing $(z-c_n)$ must approach 1 as $n\to\infty$. So it stands to reason that one should seek factor functions that could be 0 at a prescribed point, yet remain near 1 when not at that point, and furthermore introduce no more zeroes than those prescribed. Weierstrass' elementary factors have these properties and serve the same purpose as the factors $(z-c_n)$ above.

== Elementary factors ==
Consider the functions of the form $\exp\left(-\tfrac{z^{n+1}}{n+1}\right)$ for $n \in \mathbb{N}$. At $z=0$, they evaluate to $1$ and have a flat slope at order up to $n$. Right after $z=1$, they sharply fall to some small positive value. In contrast, consider the function $1-z$ which has no flat slope but, at $z=1$, evaluates to exactly zero. Also note that for |z| < 1,

$$(1-z) = \exp(\ln(1-z)) = \exp \left( -\tfrac{z^1}{1} - \tfrac{z^2}{2} - \tfrac{z^3}{3} + \cdots \right).$$

Plot of E_{n}(x) for n = 0, ..., 4 and x in the interval [−1, 1]

The elementary factors, also referred to as primary factors, are functions that combine the properties of zero slope and zero value (see graphic):

$$E_n(z) = \begin{cases} (1-z) & \text{if }n=0, \\ (1-z)\exp \left( \frac{z^1}{1}+\frac{z^2}{2}+\cdots+\frac{z^n}{n} \right) & \text{otherwise}. \end{cases}$$

For |z| < 1 and $n>0$, one may express it as $\displaystyle E_n(z)=\exp\left(-\tfrac{z^{n+1}}{n+1}\sum_{k=0}^\infty\tfrac{z^k}{1+k/(n+1)}\right)$ and one can read off how those properties are enforced.

The utility of the elementary factors $E_n(z)$ lies in the following lemma:

Lemma (15.8, Rudin) for |z| ≤ 1, $n \in \mathbb{N}$

$$\vert 1 - E_n(z) \vert \leq \vert z \vert^{n+1}.$$

=== Existence of entire function with specified zeroes ===
Let $\{a_n\}$ be a sequence of non-zero complex numbers such that $|a_n|\to\infty$. If $\{p_n\}$ is any sequence of nonnegative integers such that for all $r>0$,

$$\sum_{n=1}^\infty \left( r/|a_n|\right)^{1+p_n} < \infty,$$

then the function

$$E(z) = \prod_{n=1}^\infty E_{p_n}(z/a_n)$$

is entire with zeros only at points $a_n$. If a number $z_0$ occurs in the sequence $\{a_n\}$ exactly m times, then the function E has a zero at $z=z_0$ of multiplicity m.

- The sequence $\{p_n\}$ in the statement of the theorem always exists. For example, we could always take $p_n=n$ and have the convergence. Such a sequence is not unique: changing it at finite number of positions, or taking another sequence p′_{n} ≥ p_{n}, will not break the convergence.
- The theorem generalizes to the following: sequences in open subsets (and hence regions) of the Riemann sphere have associated functions that are holomorphic in those subsets and have zeroes at the points of the sequence.

== Weierstrass factorization theorem ==
Let ƒ be an entire function, and let $\{a_n\}$ be the non-zero zeros of ƒ repeated according to multiplicity; suppose also that ƒ has a zero at z = 0 of order m ≥ 0. (Note: A zero of order m = 0 at z = 0 is taken to mean ƒ(0) ≠ 0 — that is, $f$ does not have a zero at $0$.) Then there exists an entire function g and a sequence of integers $\{p_n\}$ such that

$f(z)=z^m e^{g(z)} \prod_{n=1}^\infty E_{p_n}\!\!\left(\frac{z}{a_n}\right).$

The case given by the fundamental theorem of algebra is incorporated here. If the sequence $\{a_n\}$ is finite then we can take $p_n = 0$, $m=0$ and $e^{g(z)}=c$ to obtain $\, f(z) = c\,{\displaystyle\prod}_n (z-a_n)$.

=== Examples of factorization ===
The trigonometric functions sine and cosine have the factorizations
$$\sin \pi z = \pi z \prod_{n\neq 0} \left(1-\frac{z}{n}\right)e^{z/n} = \pi z\prod_{n=1}^\infty \left(1-\left(\frac{z}{n}\right)^2\right)$$
$$\cos \pi z = \prod_{q \in \mathbb{Z}, \, q \; \text{odd} } \left(1-\frac{2z}{q}\right)e^{2z/q} = \prod_{n=0}^\infty \left( 1 - \left(\frac{z}{n+\tfrac{1}{2}} \right)^2 \right)$$
while the gamma function $\Gamma$ has factorization
$$\frac{1}{\Gamma (z)}=e^{\gamma z}z\prod_{n=1}^{\infty }\left ( 1+\frac{z}{n} \right )e^{-z/n},$$
where $\gamma$ is the Euler–Mascheroni constant. The cosine identity can be seen as special case of
$$\frac{1}{\Gamma(s-z)\Gamma(s+z)} = \frac{1}{\Gamma(s)^2}\prod_{n=0}^\infty \left( 1 - \left(\frac{z}{n+s} \right)^2 \right)$$
for $s=\tfrac{1}{2}$.

== Hadamard factorization theorem ==
A special case of the Weierstrass factorization theorem occurs for entire functions of finite order. In this case the $p_n$ can be taken independent of $n$ and the function $g(z)$ is a polynomial. Thus
$$f(z)=z^me^{P(z)}\prod_{k=1}^\infty E_p(z/a_k)$$
where $a_k$ are those roots of $f$ that are not zero ($a_k \neq 0$), $m$ is the order of the zero of $f$ at $z = 0$ (the case $m = 0$ being taken to mean $f(0) \neq 0$), $P$ a polynomial (whose degree we shall call $q$), and $p$ is the smallest non-negative integer such that the series
$$\sum_{n=1}^\infty\frac{1}{|a_n|^{p+1}}$$
converges. This is called Hadamard's canonical representation. The non-negative integer $g=\max\{p,q\}$ is called the genus of the entire function $f$. The order $\rho$ of $f$ satisfies
$$g \leq \rho \leq g + 1$$
In other words: If the order $\rho$ is not an integer, then $g = [ \rho ]$ is the integer part of $\rho$. If the order is a positive integer, then there are two possibilities: $g = \rho-1$ or $g = \rho$.

For example, $\sin$, $\cos$ and $\exp$ are entire functions of genus $g = \rho = 1$.

== See also ==
- Mittag-Leffler's theorem
- Wallis product, which can be derived from this theorem applied to the sine function
- Blaschke product
