= Binomial series =

Mathematical series

In mathematics, the binomial series is a generalization of the binomial formula to cases where the exponent is not a positive integer:

$$\begin{align} (1+x)^\alpha &= \sum_{k=0}^\infty \!\binom\alpha k x^k \\ &= 1 +\alpha x +\frac{\alpha(\alpha-1)}{2!} x^2 +\frac{\alpha(\alpha-1)(\alpha-2)}{3!} x^3 +\cdots \end{align}$$	1

where $\alpha$ is any complex number, and the power series on the right-hand side is expressed in terms of the (generalized) binomial coefficients

$$\binom{\alpha}{k} = \frac{\alpha (\alpha-1) (\alpha-2) \cdots (\alpha-k+1)}{k!}.$$

The binomial series is the MacLaurin series for the function $f(x)=(1+x)^\alpha$. It converges when $|x| < 1$.

If α is a nonnegative integer n then the x^{n + 1} term and all later terms in the series are 0, since each contains a factor of (n − n). In this case, the series is a finite polynomial, equivalent to the binomial formula.

== Convergence ==
=== Conditions for convergence ===
Whether (1) converges depends on the values of the complex numbers α and x. More precisely:

1. If |x| < 1, the series converges absolutely for any complex number α.
2. If |x| = 1, the series converges absolutely if and only if either Re(α) > 0 or α = 0, where Re(α) denotes the real part of α.
3. If |x| = 1 and x ≠ −1, the series converges if and only if Re(α) > −1.
4. If x = −1, the series converges if and only if either Re(α) > 0 or α = 0.
5. If |x| > 1, the series diverges except when α is a non-negative integer, in which case the series is a finite sum.

In particular, if α is not a non-negative integer, the situation at the boundary of the disk of convergence, |x| = 1, is summarized as follows:

- If Re(α) > 0, the series converges absolutely.
- If −1 < Re(α) ≤ 0, the series converges conditionally if x ≠ −1 and diverges if x = −1.
- If Re(α) ≤ −1, the series diverges.

=== Identities to be used in the proof ===
The following hold for any complex number α:

$${\alpha \choose 0} \!= 1,$$

${\alpha \choose k+1} \!= \!{\alpha\choose k} \frac{\alpha-k}{k+1},$	2

${\alpha \choose k-1} \!+ \!{\alpha\choose k} \!= \!{\alpha+1 \choose k}.$	3

Unless $\alpha$ is a nonnegative integer (in which case the binomial coefficients vanish as $k$ is larger than $\alpha$), a useful asymptotic relationship for the binomial coefficients is, in Landau notation:

${\alpha \choose k} \!= \frac{(-1)^k} {\Gamma(-\alpha)k^ {1+\alpha} } \,(1+o(1)), \quad\text{as }k\to\infty.$	4

This is essentially equivalent to Euler's definition of the Gamma function:

$$\Gamma(z) = \lim_{k \to \infty} \frac{k! \,k^z}{z(z+1)\cdots(z+k)},$$

and implies immediately the coarser bounds

$\frac {m} {k^{1+\operatorname{Re}\,\alpha}}\le \left|{\alpha \choose k}\right| \le \frac {M} {k^{1+\operatorname{Re}\alpha}},$	5

for some positive constants m and M .

Formula (2) for the generalized binomial coefficient can be rewritten as

${\alpha \choose k} \!= \prod_{j=1}^k \!\left(\frac{\alpha + 1}j - 1 \right).$	6

=== Proof ===
To prove (i) and (v), apply the ratio test and use formula (2) above to show that whenever $\alpha$ is not a nonnegative integer, the radius of convergence is exactly 1. Part (ii) follows from formula (5), by comparison with the p-series

$$\sum_{k=1}^\infty \frac1{k^p},$$

with $p=1+\operatorname{Re}(\alpha)$. To prove (iii), first use formula (3) to obtain

$(1 + x) \sum_{k=0}^n \!{\alpha \choose k} x^k =\sum_{k=0}^n \!{\alpha+1\choose k} x^k + {\alpha \choose n} x^{n+1},$	7

and then use (ii) and formula (5) again to prove convergence of the right-hand side when $\operatorname{Re}(\alpha)> - 1$ is assumed. On the other hand, the series does not converge if $|x|=1$ and $\operatorname{Re}(\alpha) \le - 1$, again by formula (5). Alternatively, we may observe that for all $j$, $\left| \frac{\alpha + 1}j - 1 \right| \ge 1 - \frac{\operatorname{Re} (\alpha) + 1}j \ge 1$. Thus, by formula (6), for all $k, \left|{\alpha \choose k} \right| \ge 1$. This completes the proof of (iii). Turning to (iv), we use identity (7) above with $x=-1$ and $\alpha-1$ in place of $\alpha$, along with formula (4), to obtain

$$\sum_{k=0}^n \!{\alpha\choose k} (-1)^k = \!{\alpha-1 \choose n} (-1)^n= \frac1{\Gamma(-\alpha+1)n^\alpha} (1+o(1))$$

as $n\to\infty$. Assertion (iv) now follows from the asymptotic behavior of the sequence $n^{-\alpha} = e^{-\alpha \log(n)}$. (Precisely, $\left|e^{-\alpha\log n}\right| = e^{-\operatorname{Re}(\alpha) \log n}$ certainly converges to $0$ if $\operatorname{Re}(\alpha)>0$ and diverges to $+\infty$ if $\operatorname{Re}(\alpha)<0$. If $\operatorname{Re}(\alpha)=0$, then $n^{-\alpha} = e^{-i \operatorname{Im}(\alpha)\log n}$ converges if and only if the sequence $\operatorname{Im}(\alpha)\log n$ converges $\bmod{2\pi}$, which is certainly true if $\alpha=0$ but false if $\operatorname{Im}(\alpha) \ne 0$: in the latter case the sequence is dense $\!\bmod{2\pi}$, due to the fact that $\log n$ diverges and $\log (n+1)-\log n$ converges to zero).

== Summation of the binomial series ==
The usual argument to compute the sum of the binomial series goes as follows. Differentiating term-wise the binomial series within the disk of convergence |x| < 1 and using formula (1), one has that the sum of the series is an analytic function solving the ordinary differential equation (1 + x)u′(x) − αu(x) = 0 with initial condition u(0) = 1.

The unique solution of this problem is the function u(x) = (1 + x)^{α}. Indeed, multiplying by the integrating factor (1 + x)^{−α−1} gives

$$0=(1+x)^{-\alpha}u'(x) - \alpha (1+x)^{-\alpha-1} u(x)=  \big[(1+x)^{-\alpha}u(x)\big]'\,,$$

so the function (1 + x)^{−α}u(x) is a constant, which the initial condition tells us is 1. That is, u(x) = (1 + x)^{α} is the sum of the binomial series for |x| < 1.

The equality extends to |x| = 1 whenever the series converges, as a consequence of Abel's theorem and by continuity of (1 + x)^{α}.

== Negative binomial series ==
Closely related is the negative binomial series defined by the MacLaurin series for the function $g(x)=(1-x)^{-\alpha}$, where $\alpha \in \Complex$ and $|x| < 1$. Explicitly,

$$\begin{align}
\frac{1}{(1 - x)^\alpha} &= \sum_{k=0}^{\infty} \; \frac{g^{(k)}(0)}{k!} \; x^k \\
&= 1 + \alpha x + \frac{\alpha(\alpha+1)}{2!} x^2 + \frac{\alpha(\alpha+1)(\alpha+2)}{3!} x^3 + \cdots,
\end{align}$$

which is written in terms of the multiset coefficient

$$\left(\!\!{\alpha\choose k}\!\!\right) = {\alpha+k-1 \choose k} = \frac{\alpha (\alpha+1) (\alpha+2) \cdots (\alpha+k-1)}{k!}\,.$$

When α is a positive integer, several common sequences are apparent. The case α = 1 gives the series 1 + x + x^{2} + x^{3} + ..., where the coefficient of each term of the series is simply 1. The case α = 2 gives the series 1 + 2x + 3x^{2} + 4x^{3} + ..., which has the counting numbers as coefficients. The case α = 3 gives the series 1 + 3x + 6x^{2} + 10x^{3} + ..., which has the triangle numbers as coefficients. The case α = 4 gives the series 1 + 4x + 10x^{2} + 20x^{3} + ..., which has the tetrahedral numbers as coefficients, and similarly for higher integer values of α.

The negative binomial series includes the case of the geometric series, the power series
$$\frac{1}{1-x} = \sum_{n=0}^\infty x^n$$
(which is the negative binomial series when $\alpha=1$, convergent in the disc $|x|<1$) and, more generally, series obtained by differentiation of the geometric power series:
$$\frac{1}{(1-x)^n} = \frac{1}{(n-1)!}\frac{d^{n-1}}{dx^{n-1}}\frac{1}{1-x}$$
with $\alpha=n$, a positive integer.

== History ==
The first results concerning binomial series for other than positive-integer exponents were given by Sir Isaac Newton in the study of areas enclosed under certain curves. John Wallis built upon this work by considering expressions of the form y = (1 − x^{2})^{m} where m is a fraction. He found that (written in modern terms) the successive coefficients c_{k} of (−x^{2})^{k} are to be found by multiplying the preceding coefficient by (m − (k − 1))/k (as in the case of integer exponents), thereby implicitly giving a formula for these coefficients. He explicitly writes the following instances (Note: In fact this source gives all non-constant terms with a negative sign, which is not correct for the second equation; one must assume this is an error of transcription.)

$$(1-x^2)^{1/2}=1-\frac{x^2}2-\frac{x^4}8-\frac{x^6}{16}\cdots$$

$$(1-x^2)^{3/2}=1-\frac{3x^2}2+\frac{3x^4}8+\frac{x^6}{16}\cdots$$

$$(1-x^2)^{1/3}=1-\frac{x^2}3-\frac{x^4}9-\frac{5x^6}{81}\cdots$$

The binomial series is therefore sometimes referred to as Newton's binomial theorem. Newton gives no proof and is not explicit about the nature of the series. Later, on 1826 Niels Henrik Abel discussed the subject in a paper published on Crelle's Journal, treating notably questions of convergence.

== See also ==
- Binomial approximation
- Binomial theorem
- Table of Newtonian series
- Lambert W function
