= Newton's series =

Newton's series may refer to:

- The Newton series for finite differences, used in interpolation theory.
- The binomial series, first proved by Isaac Newton.
