= Joseph Ludwig Raabe =

Swiss mathematician (1801–1859)

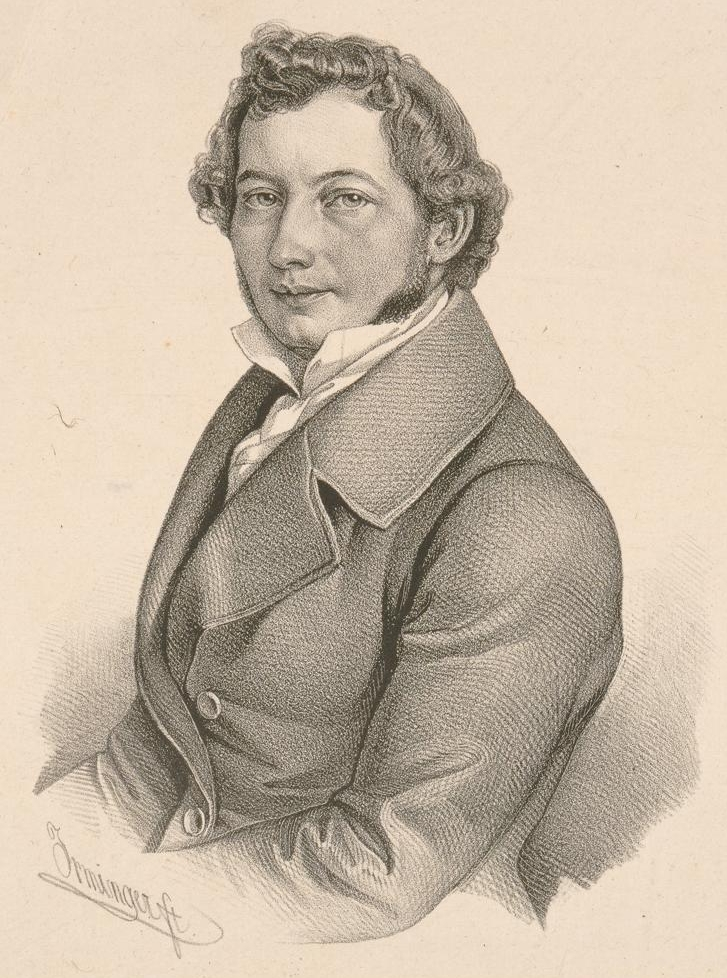
Portrait by Carl Friedrich Irminger, c. 1850

Joseph Ludwig Raabe (15 May 1801 – 22 January 1859) was a Swiss mathematician best known for Raabe's ratio test.

== Life ==
Raabe was born on 15 May 1801 into a Jewish family in Brody, Austrian Galicia (now in Ukraine). He was the son of Haja and Wolf Raabe, a writer and small businessman. As his parents were quite poor, Raabe was forced to earn his living from a very early age by giving private lessons. He studied mathematics at the Imperial-Royal Polytechnic Institute in Vienna from 1821 until 1827, the year he converted to Catholicism.

Encouraged by Swiss mathematician Johannes Eschmann, Raabe moved to Zürich in the autumn of 1831, where he became professor of mathematics at the gymnasium and Privatdozent at the University of Zürich in 1833. He was appointed associate professor at the university in 1843 and full professor in 1855. Rabbe became professor at the newly founded Swiss Polytechnicum (now ETH Zurich) in 1855.

Raabe acquired the bourgeoisie of Schwamendingen-Oerlikon in 1836 and received a doctor honoris causa from the University of Zürich in 1846. He died on 12 January 1859 in Zürich, aged 57.

== Work ==
Raabe published works on definite integrals, Bernoulli numbers and series theory. He is best known for Raabe's ratio test, an extension of d'Alembert's ratio test. Raabe's test serves to determine the convergence or divergence of an infinite series, in some cases. He is also known for the Raabe integral of the gamma function:

$$\int_a^{a+1}\log\Gamma(t)\, dt = \tfrac{1}{2}\log 2\pi + a\log a - a,\quad a\ge0.$$

== Publications ==
- Differential- und Integralrechnung (3 volumes) (Zürich, 1839–1847)
- Mathematische Mitteilungen (2 volumes) (1857-1858)
