= Total algebra =

Generalization of monoid ring

In abstract algebra, the total algebra of a monoid is a generalization of the monoid ring that allows for infinite sums of elements of a ring. Suppose that S is a monoid with the property that, for all $s\in S$, there exist only finitely many ordered pairs $(t,u)\in S\times S$ for which $tu=s$. Let R be a ring. Then the total algebra of S over R is the set $R^S$ of all functions $\alpha:S\to R$ with the addition law given by the (pointwise) operation:

$$(\alpha+\beta)(s)=\alpha(s)+\beta(s)$$

and with the multiplication law given by:

$$(\alpha\cdot\beta)(s) = \sum_{tu=s}\alpha(t)\beta(u).$$

The sum on the right-hand side has finite support, and so is well-defined in R.

These operations turn $R^S$ into a ring. There is an embedding of R into $R^S$, given by the constant functions, which turns $R^S$ into an R-algebra.

An example is the ring of formal power series, where the monoid S is the natural numbers. The product is then the Cauchy product.
