= Convergence tests =

Mathematical criterion about whether a series converges

In mathematics, convergence tests are methods of testing for the convergence, conditional convergence, absolute convergence, interval of convergence or divergence of an infinite series $\sum_{n=1}^\infty a_n$.

== List of tests ==
=== Limit of the summand ===
If the limit of the summand is undefined or nonzero, that is $\lim_{n \to \infty}a_n \ne 0$, then the series must diverge. In this sense, the partial sums are Cauchy only if this limit exists and is equal to zero. The test is inconclusive if the limit of the summand is zero. This is also known as the nth-term test, test for divergence, or the divergence test.

=== Ratio test ===
This is also known as d'Alembert's criterion.

Consider two limits $\ell=\liminf_{n\to\infty}\left|\frac{a_{n+1}}{a_n}\right|$ and $L=\limsup_{n\to\infty}\left|\frac{a_{n+1}}{a_n}\right|$. If $\ell>1$, the series diverges. If $L<1$ then the series converges absolutely. If $\ell\le1\le L$ then the test is inconclusive, and the series may converge absolutely or conditionally or diverge.

=== Root test ===
This is also known as the nth root test or Cauchy's criterion.

Let

$$r=\limsup_{n\to\infty}\sqrt[n]{|a_n|},$$

where $\limsup$ denotes the limit superior (possibly $\infty$; if the limit exists it is the same value).
If r < 1, then the series converges absolutely. If r > 1, then the series diverges. If r = 1, the root test is inconclusive, and the series may converge or diverge.

The root test is stronger than the ratio test: whenever the ratio test determines the convergence or divergence of an infinite series, the root test does too, but not conversely.

=== Integral test ===
The series can be compared to an integral to establish convergence or divergence. Let $f:[1,\infty)\to\R_+$ be a non-negative and monotonically decreasing function such that $f(n) = a_n$. If
$$\int_1^\infty f(x) \, dx=\lim_{t\to\infty}\int_1^t f(x) \, dx<\infty,$$
then the series converges. But if the integral diverges, then the series does so as well. In other words, the series ${a_n}$ converges if and only if the integral converges.

==== p-series test ====
A commonly used corollary of the integral test is the p-series test. Let $k > 0$. Then $\sum_{n=k}^{\infty} \bigg(\frac{1}{n^p}\bigg)$ converges if $p > 1$.

The case of $p = 1, k = 1$ yields the harmonic series, which diverges. The case of $p = 2, k = 1$ is the Basel problem and the series converges to $\frac{\pi^2}{6}$. In general, for $p > 1, k = 1$, the series is equal to the Riemann zeta function applied to $p$, that is $\zeta(p)$.

=== Direct comparison test ===
If the series $\sum_{n=1}^\infty b_n$ is an absolutely convergent series and $|a_n|\le |b_n|$ for sufficiently large n , then the series $\sum_{n=1}^\infty a_n$ converges absolutely.

=== Limit comparison test ===
If $\{a_n\},\{b_n\}>0$, (that is, each element of the two sequences is positive) and the limit $\lim_{n\to\infty} \frac{a_n}{b_n}$ exists, is finite and non-zero, then either both series converge or both series diverge.

=== Cauchy condensation test ===
Let $\left \{ a_n \right \}$ be a non-negative non-increasing sequence. Then the sum $A = \sum_{n=1}^\infty a_n$ converges if and only if the sum $A^* = \sum_{n=0}^\infty 2^n a_{2^n}$ converges. Moreover, if they converge, then $A \leq A^* \leq 2A$ holds.

=== Abel's test ===
Suppose the following statements are true:

1. $\sum a_n$ is a convergent series,
2. $\left\{b_n\right\}$ is a monotonic sequence, and
3. $\left\{b_n\right\}$ is bounded.

Then $\sum a_nb_n$ is also convergent.

=== Absolute convergence test ===
Every absolutely convergent series converges.

=== Alternating series test ===
Suppose the following statements are true:

- $(a_n)_{n=1}^\infty$ is monotonic,
- $\lim_{n \to \infty} a_n = 0$

Then $\sum_{n = 1}^\infty (-1)^{n} a_n$ and $\sum_{n = 1}^\infty (-1)^{n+1} a_n$ are convergent series. This test is also known as the Leibniz criterion.

=== Dirichlet's test ===
If $\{a_n\}$ is a sequence of real numbers and $\{b_n\}$ a sequence of complex numbers satisfying

- $a_n \geq a_{n+1}$

- $\lim_{n \rightarrow \infty}a_n = 0$

- $\left|\sum^{N}_{n=1}b_n\right|\leq M$ for every positive integer N

where M is some constant, then the series

$$\sum^{\infty}_{n=1}a_n b_n$$

converges.

=== Cauchy's convergence test ===
A series $\sum_{i=0}^\infty a_i$ is convergent if and only if for every $\varepsilon>0$ there is a natural number N such that

$$|a_{n+1}+a_{n+2}+\cdots+a_{n+p}|<\varepsilon$$

holds for all n > N and all p ≥ 1.

=== Stolz–Cesàro theorem ===
Let $(a_n)_{n \geq 1}$ and $(b_n)_{n \geq 1}$ be two sequences of real numbers. Assume that $(b_n)_{n \geq 1}$ is a strictly monotone and divergent sequence and the following limit exists:

$$\lim_{n \to \infty} \frac{a_{n+1}-a_n}{b_{n+1}-b_n}=l.\$$

Then, the limit

$$\lim_{n \to \infty} \frac{a_n}{b_n}=l.\$$

=== Weierstrass M-test ===
Suppose that (f_{n}) is a sequence of real- or complex-valued functions defined on a set A, and that there is a sequence of non-negative numbers (M_{n}) satisfying the conditions

- $|f_n(x)|\leq M_n$ for all $n \geq 1$ and all $x \in A$, and
- $\sum_{n=1}^{\infty} M_n$ converges.

Then the series

$$\sum_{n=1}^{\infty} f_n (x)$$

converges absolutely and uniformly on A.

=== Extensions to the ratio test ===
The ratio test may be inconclusive when the limit of the ratio is 1. Extensions to the ratio test, however, sometimes allows one to deal with this case.

==== Raabe–Duhamel's test ====
Let { a_{n} } be a sequence of positive numbers.

Define

$$b_n=n\left(\frac{a_n}{a_{n+1}}-1 \right).$$

If

$$L=\lim_{n\to\infty}b_n$$

exists there are three possibilities:

- if L > 1 the series converges (this includes the case L = ∞)
- if L < 1 the series diverges
- and if L = 1 the test is inconclusive.

An alternative formulation of this test is as follows. Let { a_{n} } be a series of real numbers. Then if b > 1 and K (a natural number) exist such that

$$\left|\frac{a_{n+1}}{a_n}\right|\le 1-\frac{b}{n}$$

for all n > K then the series {a_{n}} is convergent.

==== Bertrand's test ====
Let { a_{n} } be a sequence of positive numbers.

Define

$$b_n=\ln n\left(n\left(\frac{a_n}{a_{n+1}}-1 \right)-1\right).$$

If

$$L=\lim_{n\to\infty}b_n$$

exists, there are three possibilities:

- if L > 1 the series converges (this includes the case L = ∞)
- if L < 1 the series diverges
- and if L = 1 the test is inconclusive.

==== Gauss's test ====
Let { a_{n} } be a sequence of positive numbers. If $\frac{a_n}{a_{n + 1}} = 1+ \frac{\alpha}{n} + O(1/n^\beta)$ for some β > 1, then $\sum a_n$ converges if α > 1 and diverges if α ≤ 1.

==== Kummer's test ====
Let { a_{n} } be a sequence of positive numbers. Then:

(1) $\sum a_n$ converges if and only if there is a sequence $b_{n}$ of positive numbers and a real number c > 0 such that $b_k (a_{k}/a_{k+1}) - b_{k+1} \ge c$.

(2) $\sum a_n$ diverges if and only if there is a sequence $b_{n}$ of positive numbers such that $b_k (a_{k}/a_{k+1}) - b_{k+1} \le 0$

and $\sum 1/b_{n}$ diverges.

=== Abu-Mostafa's test ===
Let $\sum_{n=1}^\infty a_n$ be an infinite series with real terms and let $f:\R\to\R$ be any real function such that $f(1/n)=a_n$ for all positive integers n and the second derivative $f''$ exists at $x=0$. Then $\sum_{n=1}^\infty a_n$ converges absolutely if $f(0)=f'(0)=0$ and diverges otherwise.

=== Notes ===
- For some specific types of series there are more specialized convergence tests, for instance for Fourier series there is the Dini test.

== Examples ==
Consider the series

$\sum_{n=1}^{\infty} \frac{1}{n^\alpha}.$	i

Cauchy condensation test implies that (i) is finitely convergent if

$\sum_{n=1}^\infty 2^n \left( \frac 1 {2^n}\right)^\alpha$	ii

is finitely convergent. Since

$$\sum_{n=1}^\infty 2^n \left( \frac 1 {2^n} \right)^\alpha = \sum_{n=1}^\infty 2^{n-n\alpha} = \sum_{n=1}^\infty 2^{(1-\alpha) n}$$

(ii) is a geometric series with ratio $2^{(1-\alpha)}$. (ii) is finitely convergent if its ratio is less than one (namely $\alpha > 1$). Thus, (i) is finitely convergent if and only if $\alpha > 1$.

== Convergence of products ==
While most of the tests deal with the convergence of infinite series, they can also be used to show the convergence or divergence of infinite products. This can be achieved using following theorem: Let $\left \{ a_n \right \}_{n=1}^\infty$ be a sequence of positive numbers. Then the infinite product $\prod_{n=1}^\infty (1 + a_n)$ converges if and only if the series $\sum_{n=1}^\infty a_n$ converges. Also similarly, if $0 \leq a_n < 1$ holds, then $\prod_{n=1}^\infty (1 - a_n)$ approaches a non-zero limit if and only if the series $\sum_{n=1}^\infty a_n$ converges .

This can be proved by taking the logarithm of the product and using limit comparison test.

== See also ==
- L'Hôpital's rule
- Shift rule
