= Root test =

Criterion for the convergence of an infinite series

In mathematics, the root test (sometimes called the Cauchy root test or Cauchy's radical test) is a criterion for the convergence (a convergence test) of an infinite series. It depends on the quantity

$$\limsup_{n\rightarrow\infty}\sqrt[n]{|a_n|},$$

where $a_n$ are the terms of the series, and states that the series converges absolutely if this quantity is less than one, but diverges if it is greater than one.

The root test was developed first by Augustin-Louis Cauchy who published it in his textbook Cours d'analyse (1821).

== Root test explanation ==
Decision diagram for the root test

For a series

$$\sum_{n=1}^\infty a_n$$

the root test uses the number

$$C = \limsup_{n\rightarrow\infty}\sqrt[n]{|a_n|},$$

where "lim sup" denotes the limit superior, possibly +∞. Note that if

$$\lim_{n\rightarrow\infty}\sqrt[n]{|a_n|},$$

converges then it equals C and may be used in the root test instead.

The root test states that:

- if C < 1 then the series converges absolutely,
- if C > 1 then the series diverges,
- if C = 1 and the limit approaches strictly from above then the series diverges,
- otherwise the test is inconclusive (the series may diverge, converge absolutely or converge conditionally).

There are some series for which C = 1 and the series converges, e.g. $\textstyle \sum 1/{n^2}$, and there are others for which C = 1 and the series diverges, e.g. $\textstyle\sum 1/n$.

== Application to power series ==
This test can be used with a power series

$$f(z) = \sum_{n=0}^\infty c_n (z-p)^n$$

where the coefficients c_{n}, and the center p are complex numbers and the argument z is a complex variable.

The terms of this series would then be given by a_{n} = c_{n}(z − p)^{n}. One then applies the root test to the a_{n} as above. Note that sometimes a series like this is called a power series "around p", because the radius of convergence is the radius R of the largest interval or disc centred at p such that the series will converge for all points z strictly in the interior (convergence on the boundary of the interval or disc generally has to be checked separately).

A corollary of the root test applied to a power series is the Cauchy–Hadamard theorem: the radius of convergence is exactly $1/\limsup_{n \rightarrow \infty}{\sqrt[n]{|c_n|}},$ taking care that we really mean ∞ if the denominator is 0.

== Proof ==
The proof of the convergence of a series Σa_{n} is an application of the comparison test.

If for all n ≥ N (N some fixed natural number) we have $\sqrt[n]{|a_n|} \le k < 1$, then $|a_n| \le k^n < 1$. Since the geometric series $\sum_{n=N}^\infty k^n$ converges so does $\sum_{n=N}^\infty |a_n|$ by the comparison test. Hence Σa_{n} converges absolutely.

If $\sqrt[n]{|a_n|} > 1$ for infinitely many n, then a_{n} fails to converge to 0, hence the series is divergent.

Proof of corollary: For a power series Σa_{n} = Σc_{n}(z − p)^{n}, we see by the above that the series converges if there exists an N such that for all n ≥ N we have

$$\sqrt[n]{|a_n|} = \sqrt[n]{|c_n(z - p)^n|} < 1,$$

equivalent to

$$\sqrt[n]{|c_n|}\cdot|z - p| < 1$$

for all n ≥ N, which implies that in order for the series to converge we must have $|z - p| < 1/\sqrt[n]{|c_n|}$ for all sufficiently large n. This is equivalent to saying

$$|z - p| < 1/\limsup_{n \rightarrow \infty}{\sqrt[n]{|c_n|}},$$

so $R \le 1/\limsup_{n \rightarrow \infty}{\sqrt[n]{|c_n|}}.$ Now the only other place where convergence is possible is when

$$\sqrt[n]{|a_n|} = \sqrt[n]{|c_n(z - p)^n|} = 1,$$

(since points > 1 will diverge) and this will not change the radius of convergence since these are just the points lying on the boundary of the interval or disc, so

$$R = 1/\limsup_{n \rightarrow \infty}{\sqrt[n]{|c_n|}}.$$

== Examples ==
Example 1:

$$\sum_{i=1}^\infty \frac{2^i}{i^9}$$

Applying the root test and using the fact that $\lim_{n \to \infty} n^{1/n}=1,$

$$C = \lim_{n \to \infty}\sqrt[n]{\left|\frac{2^n}{n^9}\right|}= \lim_{n \to \infty}\frac{ \sqrt[n]{2^n} } { \sqrt[n]{n^9} } = \lim_{n \to \infty}\frac{ 2 }   {(n^{1/n})^9 }  = 2$$

Since $C=2>1,$ the series diverges.

Example 2:

$$\sum_{n=0}^\infty \frac{1}{2^{\lfloor n/2 \rfloor}}= 1 + 1 + \frac12 + \frac12 + \frac14 + \frac14 + \frac18 + \frac18  + \ldots$$

The root test shows convergence because

$$r= \limsup_{n\to\infty}\sqrt[n]{|a_n|} = \limsup_{n\to\infty}\sqrt[2n]{|a_{2n}|} = \limsup_{n\to\infty}\sqrt[2n]{|1/2^n|}=\frac1\sqrt{2}<1.$$

This example shows how the root test is stronger than the ratio test. The ratio test is inconclusive for this series as if $n$ is even, $a_{n+1}/a_n = 1$ while if $n$ is odd, $a_{n+1}/a_n = 1/2$, therefore the limit $\lim_{n\to\infty} |a_{n+1}/a_n|$ does not exist.

== Root tests hierarchy ==
Root tests hierarchy is built similarly to the ratio tests hierarchy (see Section 4.1 of ratio test, and more specifically Subsection 4.1.4 there).

For a series $\sum_{n=1}^\infty a_n$ with positive terms we have the following tests for convergence/divergence.

Let $K\geq1$ be an integer, and let $\ln_{(K)}(x)$ denote the $K$th iterate of natural logarithm, i.e. $\ln_{(1)}(x)=\ln (x)$ and for any $2\leq k\leq K$, $\ln_{(k)}(x)=\ln_{(k-1)}(\ln (x))$.

Suppose that $\sqrt[-n]{a_n}$, when $n$ is large, can be presented in the form

$$\sqrt[-n]{a_n}=1+\frac{1}{n}+\frac{1}{n}\sum_{i=1}^{K-1}\frac{1}{\prod_{k=1}^i\ln_{(k)}(n)}+\frac{\rho_n}{n\prod_{k=1}^K\ln_{(k)}(n)}.$$

(The empty sum is assumed to be 0.)

- The series converges, if $\liminf_{n\to\infty}\rho_n>1$
- The series diverges, if $\limsup_{n\to\infty}\rho_n<1$
- Otherwise, the test is inconclusive.

=== Proof ===
Since $\sqrt[-n]{a_n}=\mathrm{e}^{-\frac{1}{n}\ln a_n}$, then we have

$$\mathrm{e}^{-\frac{1}{n}\ln a_n}=1+\frac{1}{n}+\frac{1}{n}\sum_{i=1}^{K-1}\frac{1}{\prod_{k=1}^i\ln_{(k)}(n)}+\frac{\rho_n}{n\prod_{k=1}^K\ln_{(k)}(n)}.$$

From this,

$$\ln a_n=-n\ln\left(1+\frac{1}{n}+\frac{1}{n}\sum_{i=1}^{K-1}\frac{1}{\prod_{k=1}^i\ln_{(k)}(n)}+\frac{\rho_n}{n\prod_{k=1}^K\ln_{(k)}(n)}\right).$$

From Taylor's expansion applied to the right-hand side, we obtain:

$$\ln a_n=-1-\sum_{i=1}^{K-1}\frac{1}{\prod_{k=1}^i\ln_{(k)}(n)}-\frac{\rho_n}{\prod_{k=1}^K\ln_{(k)}(n)}+O\left(\frac{1}{n}\right).$$

Hence,

$$a_n=\begin{cases}\mathrm{e}^{-1+O(1/n)}\frac{1}{(n\prod_{k=1}^{K-2}\ln_{(k)}n)\ln^{\rho_n}_{(K-1)}n}, &K\geq2,\\
\mathrm{e}^{-1+O(1/n)}\frac{1}{n^{\rho_n}}, &K=1.
\end{cases}$$

(The empty product is set to 1.)

The final result follows from the integral test for convergence.

== See also ==
- Ratio test
- Convergent series
