= Shift rule =

Mathematical rule

The shift rule is a mathematical rule for sequences and series.

Here $n$ and $N$ are natural numbers.

For sequences, the rule states that if $(a_{n})$ is a sequence, then it converges if and only if $(a_{n+N})$ also converges, and in this case both sequences always converge to the same number.

For series, the rule states that the series $\sum\limits_{n=1}^\infty a_{n}$ converges to a number if and only if $\sum\limits_{n=1}^\infty a_{n+N}$ converges.
