= Carl Johan Malmsten =

Swedish mathematician and politician (1814–1886)

Carl Malmsten
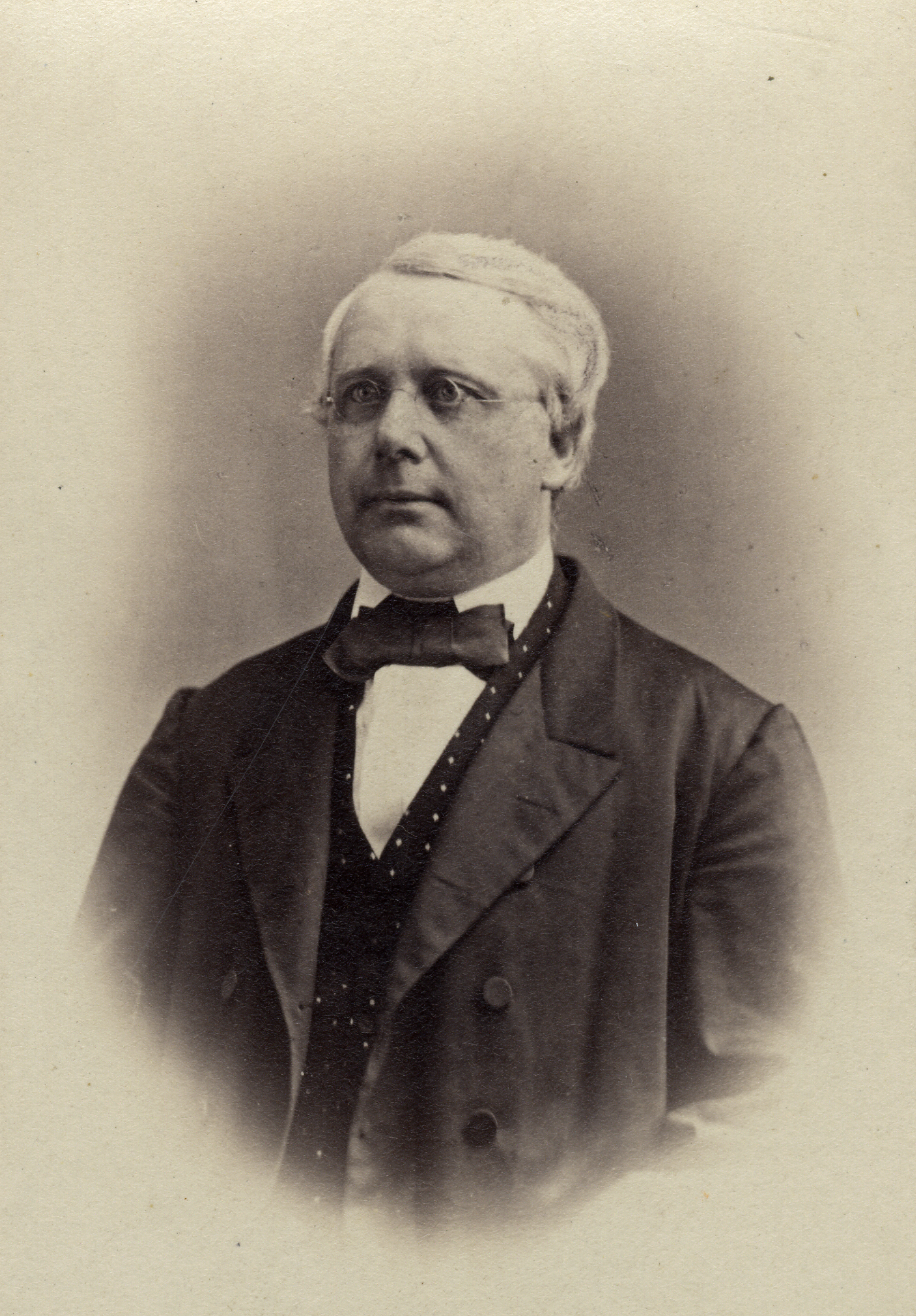
- Born: Carl Johan Malmsten; 9 April 1814; Skara, Sweden
- Died: 11 February 1886 (aged 71); Uppsala, Sweden
- Occupations: Mathematician, politician

Carl Johan Malmsten (April 9, 1814, in Uddetorp, Skara County, Sweden – February 11, 1886, in Uppsala, Sweden) was a Swedish mathematician and politician. He is notable for early research into the theory of functions of a complex variable, for the evaluation of several important logarithmic integrals and series, for his studies in the theory of Zeta-function related series and integrals, as well as for helping Mittag-Leffler start the journal Acta Mathematica. Malmsten became Docent in 1840, and then, Professor of mathematics at the Uppsala University in 1842. He was elected a member of the Royal Swedish Academy of Sciences in 1844. He was also a minister without portfolio in 1859–1866 and Governor of Skaraborg County in 1866–1879.

== Main contributions ==
Usually, Malmsten is known for his earlier works in complex analysis. However, he also greatly contributed in other branches of mathematics, but his results were undeservedly forgotten and many of them were erroneously attributed to other persons. Thus, it was comparatively recently that it was discovered by Iaroslav Blagouchine that Malmsten was first who evaluated several important logarithmic integrals and series, which are closely related to the gamma- and zeta-functions, and among which we can find the so-called Vardi's integral and the Kummer's series for the logarithm of the Gamma function. In particular, in 1842 he evaluated following lnln-logarithmic integrals.

$$\int_0^1 \!\frac{\,\ln\ln\frac{1}{x}\,}{1+x^2}\,dx\, =
\,\int_1^\infty \!\frac{\,\ln\ln{x}\,}{1+x^2}\,dx\, =
\,\frac{\pi}{\,2\,}\ln\left\{ \frac{\Gamma{(3/4)}}{\Gamma{(1/4)}}\sqrt{2\pi\,}\right\}$$

$$\int_0^{1}\frac{\ln\ln\frac{1}{x}}{(1+x)^2}\,dx = \int\limits_1^{\infty}
\!\frac{\ln\ln{x}}{(1+x)^2}\,dx =
\frac{1}{2} \bigl(\ln\tfrac\pi2 -\gamma\bigr),$$

$$\int\limits_0^{1}\! \frac{\ln\ln\frac{1}{x}}{1-x+x^2}\,dx =
\int_1^{\infty}\! \frac{\ln\ln{x}}{1-x+x^2}\,dx =
\frac{2\pi}{\sqrt{3}}\ln \biggl\{ \frac{{\sqrt[6]{(2\pi)^5}
}}{\Gamma{(1/6)}} \biggr\}$$

$$\int\limits_0^{1}\! \frac{\ln\ln\frac{1}{x}}{1+x+x^2}\,dx =
\int\limits_1^{\infty}\! \frac{\ln\ln{x}}{1+x+x^2}\,dx =
\frac{\pi}{\sqrt{3}}\ln \biggl\{ \frac{\Gamma{(2/3)}}{\Gamma
{(1/3)}}\sqrt[3]{2\pi}
\biggr\}$$

$$\int\limits_0^1 \!\frac{\ln\ln\frac{1}{x}}{1+2x\cos
\varphi+x^2}
\,dx \,=\int\limits_1^{\infty}\!\frac{\ln\ln{x}}{1+2x\cos\varphi+x^2}\,dx
=
\frac{\pi}{2\sin\varphi}\ln \left\{\frac{(2\pi)^{\frac{\scriptstyle\varphi}{\scriptstyle\pi}}
\,\Gamma\!\left(\!\displaystyle\frac{1}{\,2\,}+\frac{\varphi}{\,2\pi\,}\!\right)}
{\Gamma\!\left(\!\displaystyle\frac{1}{\,2\,}-\frac{\varphi}{\,2\pi\,}\!\right)}\right\}  ,
\qquad -\pi<\varphi<\pi$$

$$\int\limits_0^{1} \!\frac{x^{n-2}\ln\ln\frac{1}{x}}{1-x^2+x^4-\cdots
+x^{2n-2}}\,dx\, = \int\limits_1^{\infty}\!\frac{x^{n-2}\ln\ln{x}}{1-x^2+x^4-\cdots
+x^{2n-2}}\,dx =$$

$$\quad =\, \frac{\pi}{\,2n\,}\sec\frac{\,\pi\,}{2n}\!\cdot\ln \pi  +
\frac{\pi}{\,n\,}\cdot\!\!\!\!\!\!\sum_{l=1}^{\;\;\frac{1}{2}(n-1)}
\!\!\!\! (-1)^{l-1} \cos\frac{\,(2l-1)\pi\,}{2n}\cdot
\ln\left\{\!\frac{\Gamma\!\left(1-\displaystyle\frac{2l-1}{2n}\right) }
{\Gamma\!\left(\displaystyle\frac{2l-1}{2n}\right)}\right\} ,\qquad n=3,5,7,\ldots$$

$$\int\limits_0^{1} \!\frac{x^{n-2}  \ln\ln\frac{1}{x}}{
1+x^2+x^4+\cdots+x^{2n-2}}\,dx \, =
\int\limits_1^{\infty}\!\frac{x^{n-2}  \ln\ln{x}}{1+x^2+x^4+\cdots
+x^{2n-2}}\,dx =$$

$$\qquad =\begin{cases}
\displaystyle \frac{\,\pi\,}{2n}\tan\frac{\,\pi\,}{2n}\ln2\pi  + \frac{\pi}{n}\sum_{l=1}^{n-1} (-1)^{l-1}
\sin\frac{\,\pi l\,}{n}\cdot
\ln\left\{\!\frac{\Gamma\!\left(\!\displaystyle\frac{1}{\,2\,}+\displaystyle\frac{l}{\,2n}\!\right) }{\Gamma\!\left(\!\displaystyle\frac{l}{\,2n}\!\right)}\right\}
,\quad n=2,4,6,\ldots   \\[10mm]
\displaystyle \frac{\,\pi\,}{2n}\tan\frac{\,\pi\,}{2n}\ln\pi +  \frac{\pi}{n}\!\!\!\!\!
\sum_{l=1}^{\;\;\;\frac{1}{2}(n-1)} \!\!\!\! (-1)^{l-1} \sin\frac{\,\pi l\,}{n}\cdot
\ln\left\{\!\frac{\Gamma\!\left(1-\displaystyle\frac{\,l}{n}\!\right) }{\Gamma\!\left(\!\displaystyle\frac{\,l}{n}\!\right)}\right\} ,\qquad n=3,5,7,\ldots
\end{cases}$$

The details and an interesting historical analysis are given in Blagouchine's paper. Many of these integrals were later rediscovered by various researchers, including Vardi, Adamchik, Medina and Moll. Moreover, some authors even named the first of these integrals after Vardi, who re-evaluated it in 1988 (they call it Vardi's integral), and so did many well-known internet resources such as Wolfram MathWorld site or OEIS Foundation site (taking into account the undoubted Malmsten priority in the evaluation of such a kind of logarithmic integrals, it seems that the name Malmsten's integrals would be more appropriate for them). Malmsten derived the above formulae by making use of different series representations. At the same time, it has been shown that they can be also evaluated by methods of contour integration, by making use of the Hurwitz Zeta function, by employing polylogarithms and by using L-functions. More complicated forms of Malmsten's integrals appear in works of Adamchik and Blagouchine (more than 70 integrals). Below are several examples of such integrals

$$\int\limits_0^1 \frac{\ln\ln\frac{1}{x}}{1+x^3}\,dx
=\int\limits_1^\infty \frac{x\ln\ln x}{1+x^3}\,dx
=\frac{\ln2}{6}\ln\frac{3}{2}-\frac{\pi}{6\sqrt3}
\left\{\ln54-8\ln2\pi+12\ln\Gamma\left(\frac{1}{3}\right) \right\}$$

$$\int\limits_0^1 \!\frac{x\ln\ln\frac{1}{x}}{(1-x+x^2)^2}\,dx
=\int\limits_1^\infty \!\frac{x\ln\ln x}{(1-x+x^2)^2}\,dx
=-\frac{\gamma}{3}-\frac{1}{3}\ln\frac{6\sqrt3}{\pi} + \frac{\pi\sqrt3}{27}
\left\{5\ln2\pi-6\ln\Gamma\left(\frac{1}{6}\right) \right\}$$

$$\int\limits_0^1   \frac{\left(x^4-6x^2+1\right)\ln\ln\frac{1}{x}}{\,(1+x^2)^3\,}\, dx=
\int\limits_1^\infty \frac{\left(x^4-6x^2+1\right)\ln\ln{x}}{\,(1+x^2)^3\,}\, dx = \frac{2 \,\mathrm{G}}{\pi}$$

$$\int\limits_0^1  \frac{x\left(x^4-4x^2+1\right)\ln\ln\frac{1}{x}}{\,(1+x^2)^4\,}\, dx =
\int\limits_1^\infty \frac{x\left(x^4-4x^2+1\right)\ln\ln{x}}{\,(1+x^2)^4\,}\, dx = \frac{7 \zeta(3)}{8\pi^2}$$

$$\begin{array}{ll}
\displaystyle
\int\limits_0^1  \frac{x\!\left(x^{\frac{m}{n}}-x^{-\frac{m}{n}}\right)^{\!2}\ln\ln\frac{1}{x}}{\,(1-x^2)^2\,}\, dx =
\int\limits_1^\infty \frac{x\!\left(x^{\frac{m}{n}}-x^{-\frac{m}{n}}\right)^{\!2}\ln\ln{x}}{\,(1-x^2)^2\,}\, dx =  \!\!\!&\displaystyle
\frac{\,m\pi\,}{\,n\,} \sum_{l=1}^{n-1} \sin\dfrac{2\pi m l}{n}\cdot\ln\Gamma\!\left(\!\frac{l}{n}\!\right)
- \,\frac{\pi m}{\,2n\,}\cot\frac{\pi m}{n}\cdot\ln\pi n \\[3mm]
&\displaystyle
- \,\frac{\,1\,}{2}\ln\!\left(\!\frac{\,2\,}{\pi}\sin\frac{\,m\pi\,}{n}\!\right)
- \,\frac{\gamma}{2}
\end{array}$$

$$\begin{array}{l}
\displaystyle
\int\limits_0^1  \frac{x^2\!\left(x^{\frac{m}{n}}+x^{-\frac{m}{n}}\right)\ln\ln\frac{1}{x}}{\,(1+x^2)^3\,}\, dx =
\int\limits_1^\infty \frac{x^2\!\left(x^{\frac{m}{n}}+x^{-\frac{m}{n}}\right)\ln\ln{x}}{\,(1+x^2)^3\,}\, dx =
-\frac{\,\pi\left(n^2-m^2\right)\,}{8n^2}\!\sum_{l=0}^{2n-1} \! (-1)^l
\cos\dfrac{(2l+1)m\pi}{2n} \cdot\ln\Gamma\!\left(\!\frac{2l+1}{4n}\right) \\[3mm]
\displaystyle \,\,
+\frac{\,m\,}{\,8n^2\,}\! \sum_{l=0}^{2n-1} \! (-1)^l \sin\dfrac{(2l+1)m\pi}{2n}\cdot \Psi\!\left(\!\frac{2l+1}{4n}\right)
-\frac{\,1\,}{\,32\pi n^2\,} \!\sum_{l=0}^{2n-1}(-1)^l \cos\dfrac{(2l+1)m\pi}{2n}\cdot \Psi_1\!\left(\!\frac{2l+1}{4n}\right)
+ \,\frac{\,\pi (n^2-m^2)\,}{16n^2}\sec\dfrac{m \pi}{2n}\cdot\ln2\pi n
\end{array}$$

where m and n are positive integers such that m<n, G is Catalan's constant, ζ stands for the Riemann zeta-function, Ψ is the digamma function, and Ψ_{1} is the trigamma function; see respectively eq. (43), (47) and (48) in Adamchik for the first three integrals, and exercises no. 36-a, 36-b, 11-b and 13-b in Blagouchine for the last four integrals respectively (the third integral being calculated in both works). It is curious that some of Malmsten's integrals lead to the gamma- and polygamma functions of a complex argument, which are not often encountered in analysis. For instance, as shown by Iaroslav Blagouchine,

$$\int\limits_0^1 \!\frac{x\ln\ln\frac{1}{x}}{1+4x^2+x^4}\,dx
=\int\limits_1^{\infty}\!\frac{x\ln\ln{x}}{1+4x^2+x^4}\,dx
= \frac{\,\pi\,}{\,2\sqrt{3\,}\,}
\mathrm{Im}\!\left[\ln\Gamma\!\left(\!\frac{1}{2}-\frac{\ln(2+\sqrt{3\,})}{2\pi i}\right)\!\right] +\,
\frac{\ln(2+\sqrt{3\,})}{\,4\sqrt{3\,}\,}\ln\pi$$

or,

$$\int\limits_{0}^{1} \!\frac{\,x \ln\ln\frac{1}{x}\,}{\,x^4-2x^2\cosh{2}+1\,}\,dx =
\int\limits_{1}^{\infty} \!\frac{\,x \ln\ln{x}\,}{\,x^4-2x^2\cosh{2}+1\,}\,dx
=-\frac{\,\pi\,}{2\,\sinh{2}\,}
\mathrm{Im}\!\left[\ln\Gamma\!\left(\!\frac{i}{2\pi}\right)
- \ln\Gamma\!\left(\!\frac{1}{2}-\frac{i}{2\pi}\right)\!\right]
-\frac{\,\pi^2}{8\,\sinh{2}\,}-\frac{\,\ln2\pi\,}{2\,\sinh{2}\,}$$

see exercises 7-а and 37 respectively. By the way, Malmsten's integrals are also found to be closely connected to the Stieltjes constants.

In 1842, Malmsten also evaluated several important logarithmic series, among which we can find these two series

$$\sum_{n=0}^{\infty}(-1)^{n}\frac{\ln(2n+1)}{2n+1} \,=\,\frac{\pi}{4}\big(\ln\pi - \gamma) -\pi\ln\Gamma\left(\frac{3}{4}\right)$$

and

$$\sum_{n=1}^{\infty}(-1)^{n-1}
\frac{\sin a n \cdot\ln{n}}{n} \,=\,\pi\ln\left\{\frac{\pi^{\frac{1}{2}-\frac{a}{2\pi}}}{\Gamma\left(\displaystyle\frac{1}{2}+\frac{a}{2\pi}\right)}\right\} - \frac{a}{2}\big(\gamma+\ln2 \big)  -\frac{\pi}{2}\ln\cos\frac{a}{2}\,,
\qquad -\pi<a<\pi.$$

The latter series was later rediscovered in a slightly different form by Ernst Kummer, who derived a similar expression

$$\frac{1}{\pi}\sum_{n=1}^{\infty}\frac{\sin 2\pi n x \cdot\ln{n}}{n} =
\ln\Gamma(x) - \frac{1}{2}\ln(2\pi) + \frac{1}{2}\ln(2\sin\pi x) - \frac{1}{2}(\gamma+\ln2\pi)(1-2x)\,, \qquad 0<x<1,$$

in 1847 (strictly speaking, the Kummer's result is obtained from the Malmsten's one by putting a=π(2x-1)). Moreover, this series is even known in analysis as Kummer's series for the logarithm of the Gamma function, although Malmsten derived it 5 years before Kummer.

Malsmten also notably contributed into the theory of zeta-function related series and integrals. In 1842 he proved following important functional relationship for the L-function

$$L(s)\equiv\sum_{n=0}^{\infty}\frac{(-1)^n}{(2n+1)^s} \qquad\qquad
L(1-s)=L(s)\Gamma(s)  2^s \pi^{-s}\sin\frac{\pi s}{2},$$

as well as for the M-function

$$M(s)\equiv\frac{2}{\sqrt{3}}\sum_{n=1}^{\infty}\frac{(-1)^{n+1}}{n^s} \sin\frac{\pi n}{3} \qquad\qquad
M(1-s)=\displaystyle\frac{2}{\sqrt{3}} \, M(s)\Gamma(s)  3^s (2\pi)^{-s}\sin\frac{\pi s}{2},$$

where in both formulae 0<s<1. First of these formulae was proposed by Leonhard Euler already in 1749, but it was Malmsten who proved it (Euler only suggested this formula and verified it for several integer and semi-integer values of s). The same formula for L(s) was unconsciously rediscovered by Oscar Schlömilch in 1849 (proof provided only in 1858). Four years later, Malmsten derived several other similar reflection formulae, which turn out to be particular cases of the Hurwitz's functional equation.

Speaking about the Malmsten's contribution into the theory of zeta-functions, we can not fail to mention the very recent discovery of his authorship of the reflection formula for the first generalized Stieltjes constant at rational argument

$$\gamma_1 \biggl(\frac{m}{n}\biggr)- \gamma_1 \biggl(1-\frac{m}{n}
\biggr) =2\pi\sum_{l=1}^{n-1} \sin\frac{2\pi m l}{n} \cdot\ln\Gamma \biggl(\frac{l}{n} \biggr)
-\pi(\gamma+\ln2\pi n)\cot\frac{m\pi}{n}$$

where m and n are positive integers such that m<n. This identity was derived, albeit in a slightly different form, by Malmsten already in 1846 and has been also discovered independently several times by various authors. In particular, in the literature devoted to Stieltjes constants, it is often attributed to Almkvist and Meurman who derived it in 1990s.
