= Nth-term test =

Test for the divergence of an infinite series

In mathematics, the nth-term test for divergence is a simple test for the divergence of an infinite series:

If $\lim_{n \to \infty} a_n \neq 0$ or if the limit does not exist, then $\sum_{n=1}^\infty a_n$ diverges.

Many authors do not name this test or give it a shorter name.

When testing if a series converges or diverges, this test is often checked first due to its ease of use.

In the case of p-adic analysis the term test is a necessary and sufficient condition for convergence due to the non-Archimedean ultrametric triangle inequality.

== Usage ==
Unlike stronger convergence tests, the term test cannot prove by itself that a series converges. In particular, the converse to the test is not true; instead all one can say is:

If $\lim_{n \to \infty} a_n = 0,$ then $\sum_{n=1}^\infty a_n$ may or may not converge. In other words, if $\lim_{n \to \infty} a_n = 0,$ the test is inconclusive.

The harmonic series is a classic example of a divergent series whose terms approach zero in the limit as $n \rightarrow \infty$. The more general class of p-series,

$$\sum_{n=1}^\infty \frac{1}{n^p},$$

exemplifies the possible results of the test:

- If p ≤ 0, then the nth-term test identifies the series as divergent.
- If 0 < p ≤ 1, then the nth-term test is inconclusive, but the series is divergent by the integral test for convergence.
- If 1 < p, then the nth-term test is inconclusive, but the series is convergent by the integral test for convergence.

== Proofs ==
The test is typically proven in contrapositive form:

If $\sum_{n=1}^\infty a_n$ converges, then $\lim_{n \to \infty} a_n = 0.$

=== Limit manipulation ===
If s_{n} are the partial sums of the series, then the assumption that the series converges means that

$$\lim_{n\to\infty} s_n = L$$

for some number L. Then

$$\lim_{n\to\infty} a_n = \lim_{n\to\infty}(s_n-s_{n-1}) = \lim_{n\to\infty} s_n - \lim_{n\to\infty} s_{n-1} = L-L = 0.$$

=== Cauchy's criterion ===
Assuming that the series converges implies that it passes Cauchy's convergence test: for every $\varepsilon>0$ there is a number N such that

$$\left|a_{n+1}+a_{n+2}+\cdots+a_{n+p}\right|<\varepsilon$$

holds for all n > N and p ≥ 1. Setting p = 1 recovers the claim

$$\lim_{n\to\infty} a_n = 0.$$

== Scope ==
The simplest version of the term test applies to infinite series of real numbers. The above two proofs, by invoking the Cauchy criterion or the linearity of the limit, also work in any other normed vector space or any additively written abelian group.
