= Rearrangement =

Rearrangement may refer to:

== Chemistry ==
- Rearrangement reaction

== Mathematics ==
- Rearrangement inequality
- The Riemann rearrangement theorem, also called the Riemann series theorem
  - see also Lévy–Steinitz theorem
- A permutation of the terms of a conditionally convergent series

== Genetics ==
- Chromosomal rearrangements, such as:
  - Translocations
  - Ring chromosomes
  - Chromosomal inversions
