= Peter Gustav Lejeune Dirichlet =

German mathematician (1805–1859)

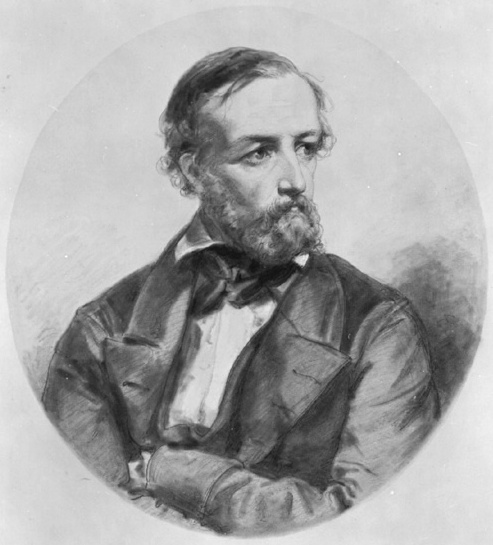
- Born: Johann Peter Gustav Lejeune Dirichlet; 13 February 1805; Düren, French Empire
- Died: 5 May 1859 (aged 54); Göttingen, Kingdom of Hanover
- Known for: See full list
- Awards: PhD (Hon): University of Bonn (1827); Pour le Mérite (1855)
- Scientific career
- Fields: Mathematician
- Workplaces: University of Breslau; University of Berlin; University of Göttingen
- Thesis: Partial Results on Fermat's Last Theorem, Exponent 5 (1827)
- Academic advisors: Siméon Poisson; Joseph Fourier; Carl Gauss
- Doctoral students: Gotthold Eisenstein; Leopold Kronecker; Rudolf Lipschitz; Carl Wilhelm Borchardt
- Other notable students: Moritz Cantor; Elwin Bruno Christoffel; Richard Dedekind; Alfred Enneper; Eduard Heine; Bernhard Riemann; Ludwig Schläfli; Ludwig von Seidel; Wilhelm Weber; Julius Weingarten

Johann Peter Gustav Lejeune Dirichlet (/ˌdɪərɪˈkleɪ/; German: [ləˈʒœn diʁiˈkleː]; 13 February 1805 – 5 May 1859) was a German mathematician. In number theory, he proved special cases of Fermat's Last Theorem and created analytic number theory. In analysis, he advanced the theory of Fourier series and was one of the first to give the modern formal definition of a function. In mathematical physics, he studied potential theory, boundary-value problems, heat diffusion, and hydrodynamics.

Although his surname is Lejeune Dirichlet, he is commonly referred to by his mononym Dirichlet, in particular for results named after him.

== Biography ==
=== Early life (1805–1822) ===
Gustav Lejeune Dirichlet was born on 13 February 1805 in Düren, a town on the left bank of the Rhine which at the time was part of the First French Empire, reverting to Prussia after the Congress of Vienna in 1815. His father Johann Arnold Lejeune Dirichlet was the postmaster, merchant, and city councilor. His paternal grandfather had come to Düren from Richelette (or more likely Richelle ), a small community 5 km (3 miles) north east of Liège in Belgium, from which his surname "Lejeune Dirichlet" ("le jeune de Richelette", French for "the youth from Richelette") was derived.

Although his family was not wealthy and he was the youngest of seven children, his parents supported his education. They enrolled him in an elementary school and then private school in hope that he would later become a merchant. The young Dirichlet, who showed a strong interest in mathematics before age 12, persuaded his parents to allow him to continue his studies. In 1817 they sent him to the Gymnasium Bonn under the care of Peter Joseph Elvenich, a student his family knew. In 1820, Dirichlet moved to the Jesuit Gymnasium in Cologne, where his lessons with Georg Ohm helped widen his knowledge in mathematics. He left the gymnasium a year later with only a certificate, as his inability to speak fluent Latin prevented him from earning the Abitur.

=== Studies in Paris (1822–1826) ===
Dirichlet again persuaded his parents to provide further financial support for his studies in mathematics, against their wish for a career in law. As Germany provided little opportunity to study higher mathematics at the time, with only Gauss at the University of Göttingen who was nominally a professor of astronomy and anyway disliked teaching, Dirichlet decided to go to Paris in May 1822. There he attended classes at the Collège de France and at the University of Paris, learning mathematics from Jean Hachette among others, while undertaking private study of Gauss's Disquisitiones Arithmeticae, a book he kept close for his entire life. In 1823 he was recommended to General Maximilien Foy, who hired him as a private tutor to teach his children German, the wage finally allowing Dirichlet to become independent from his parents' financial support.

His first original research, comprising part of a proof of Fermat's Last Theorem for the case n = 5, brought him immediate fame, being the first advance in the theorem since Fermat's own proof of the case n = 4 and Euler's proof for n = 3. Adrien-Marie Legendre, one of the referees, soon completed the proof for this case; Dirichlet completed his own proof a short time after Legendre, and a few years later produced a full proof for the case n = 14. In June 1825 he was accepted to lecture on his partial proof for the case n = 5 at the French Academy of Sciences, an exceptional feat for a 20-year-old student with no degree. His lecture at the Academy had also put Dirichlet in close contact with Fourier and Poisson, who raised his interest in theoretical physics, especially Fourier's analytic theory of heat.

=== Back to Prussia, Breslau (1825–1828) ===
As General Foy died in November 1825 and he could not find any paying position in France, Dirichlet had to return to Prussia. Fourier and Poisson introduced him to Alexander von Humboldt, who had been called to join the court of King Friedrich Wilhelm III. Humboldt, planning to make Berlin a centre of science and research, immediately offered his help to Dirichlet, sending letters in his favour to the Prussian government and to the Prussian Academy of Sciences. Humboldt also secured a recommendation letter from Gauss, who upon reading his memoir on Fermat's theorem wrote with an unusual amount of praise that "Dirichlet showed excellent talent". With the support of Humboldt and Gauss, Dirichlet was offered a teaching position at the University of Breslau. However, as he had not passed a doctoral dissertation, he submitted his memoir on the Fermat theorem as a thesis to the University of Bonn. Again his lack of fluency in Latin rendered him unable to hold the required public disputation of his thesis; after much discussion, the university decided to bypass the problem by awarding him an honorary doctorate in February 1827. Also, the Minister of Education granted him a dispensation for the Latin disputation required for the Habilitation. Dirichlet earned the Habilitation and lectured in the 1827–28 year as a Privatdozent at Breslau.

While in Breslau, Dirichlet continued his number-theoretic research, publishing important contributions to the biquadratic reciprocity law which at the time was a focal point of Gauss's research. Alexander von Humboldt took advantage of these new results, which had also drawn enthusiastic praise from Friedrich Bessel, to arrange for him the desired transfer to Berlin. Given Dirichlet's young age (he was 23 years old at the time), Humboldt was able to get him only a trial position at the Prussian Military Academy in Berlin while remaining nominally employed by the University of Breslau. The probation was extended for three years until the position becoming definite in 1831.

=== Marriage to Rebecka Mendelssohn ===
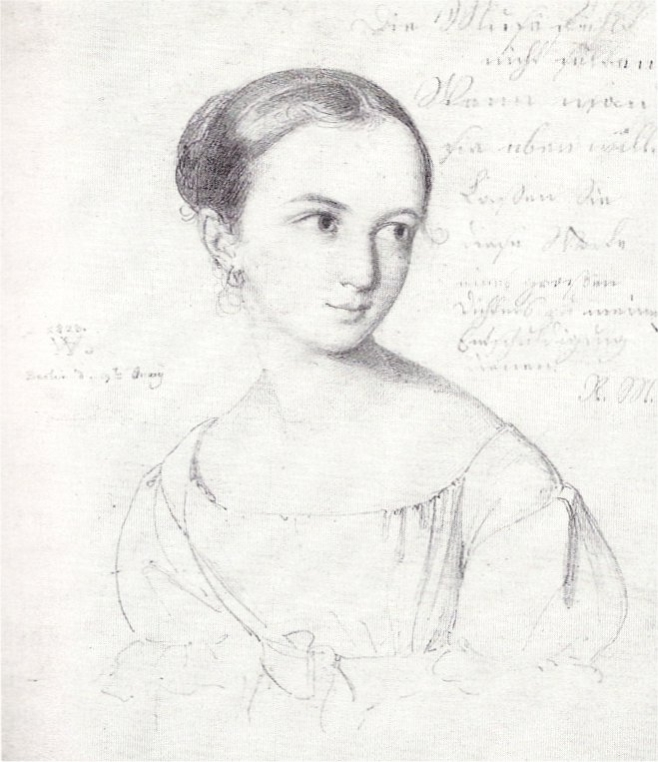
Dirichlet was married in 1832 to Rebecka Mendelssohn. They had two children, Walter (born 1833) and Flora (born 1845). Drawing by Wilhelm Hensel, 1823

After Dirichlet's move to Berlin, Humboldt introduced him to the great salons held by the banker Abraham Mendelssohn Bartholdy and his family. Their house was a weekly gathering point for Berlin artists and scientists, including Abraham's children Felix and Fanny Mendelssohn, both outstanding musicians, and the painter Wilhelm Hensel (Fanny's husband). Dirichlet showed great interest in Abraham's other daughter Rebecka, whom he married in 1832.

Rebecka Henriette Lejeune Dirichlet (née Rebecka Mendelssohn; 11 April 1811 – 1 December 1858) was a granddaughter of Moses Mendelssohn and the youngest sister of Felix Mendelssohn and Fanny Mendelssohn. Rebecka was born in Hamburg. In 1816 her parents arranged for her to be baptised at which point she took the names Rebecka Henriette Mendelssohn Bartholdy. She became a part of the notable salon of her parents, Abraham Mendelssohn and his wife Lea, having social contacts with the important musicians, artists and scientists in a highly creative period of German intellectual life. In 1829 she sang a small role in the premiere, given at the Mendelssohn house, of Felix's Singspiel Die Heimkehr aus der Fremde. She later wrote:

My older brother and sister stole my reputation as an artist. In any other family I would have been highly regarded as a musician and perhaps been leader of a group. Next to Felix and Fanny, I could not aspire to any recognition.

In 1832 she married Dirichlet, who was introduced to the Mendelssohn family by Alexander von Humboldt. In 1833 their first son, Walter, was born. She died in Göttingen in 1858.

=== Berlin (1826–1855) ===
As soon as he came to Berlin, Dirichlet applied to lecture at the University of Berlin, and the Education Minister approved the transfer and in 1831 assigned him to the faculty of philosophy. The faculty required him to undertake a renewed habilitation qualification, and although Dirichlet wrote a Habilitationsschrift as needed, he postponed giving the mandatory lecture in Latin for another 20 years, until 1851. As he had not completed this formal requirement, he remained attached to the faculty with less than full rights, including restricted emoluments, forcing him to keep in parallel his teaching position at the Military School. In 1832 Dirichlet became a member of the Prussian Academy of Sciences, the youngest member at only 27 years old.

Dirichlet had a good reputation with students for the clarity of his explanations and enjoyed teaching, especially as his University lectures tended to be on the more advanced topics in which he was doing research: number theory (he was the first German professor to give lectures on number theory), analysis and mathematical physics. He advised the doctoral theses of several important German mathematicians, as Gotthold Eisenstein, Leopold Kronecker, Rudolf Lipschitz and Carl Wilhelm Borchardt, while being influential in the mathematical formation of many other scientists, including Elwin Bruno Christoffel, Wilhelm Weber, Eduard Heine, Ludwig von Seidel and Julius Weingarten. At the Military Academy, Dirichlet managed to introduce differential and integral calculus in the curriculum, raising the level of scientific education there. However, he gradually started feeling that his double teaching load, at the Military academy and at the university, was limiting the time available for his research.

While in Berlin, Dirichlet kept in contact with other mathematicians. In 1829, during a trip, he met Carl Jacobi, at the time professor of mathematics at Königsberg University. Over the years they kept meeting and corresponding on research matters, in time becoming close friends. In 1839, during a visit to Paris, Dirichlet met Joseph Liouville, the two mathematicians becoming friends, keeping in contact and even visiting each other with the families a few years later. In 1839, Jacobi sent Dirichlet a paper by Ernst Kummer, at the time a schoolteacher. Realizing Kummer's potential, they helped him get elected in the Berlin Academy and, in 1842, obtained for him a full professor position at the University of Breslau. In 1840 Kummer married Ottilie Mendelssohn, a cousin of Rebecka's.

In 1843, when Jacobi fell ill, Dirichlet traveled to Königsberg to help him, then obtained for him the assistance of King Friedrich Wilhelm IV's personal physician. When the physician recommended that Jacobi spend some time in Italy, Dirichlet joined him on the trip together with his family. They were accompanied to Italy by Ludwig Schläfli, who came as a translator; as he was strongly interested in mathematics, both Dirichlet and Jacobi lectured to him during the trip, and he later became an important mathematician himself. The Dirichlet family extended their stay in Italy to 1845, their daughter Flora being born there. In 1844, Jacobi moved to Berlin as a royal pensioner, their friendship becoming even closer. In 1846, when the Heidelberg University tried to recruit Dirichlet, Jacobi provided von Humboldt the needed support to obtain a doubling of Dirichlet's pay at the university in order to keep him in Berlin; however, even then he was not paid a full professor wage and could not leave the Military Academy.

Holding liberal views, Dirichlet and his family supported the 1848 revolution; he even guarded with a rifle the palace of the Prince of Prussia. After the revolution failed, the Military Academy closed temporarily, causing him a large loss of income. When it reopened, the environment became more hostile to him, as officers he was teaching were expected to be loyal to the constituted government. Some of the press who had not sided with the revolution pointed him out, as well as Jacobi and other liberal professors, as "the red contingent of the staff".

In 1849 Dirichlet participated, together with his friend Jacobi, in the jubilee of Gauss's doctorate.

=== Göttingen (1855–1859) ===
Despite Dirichlet's expertise and the honours he received, and even though, by 1851, he had finally completed all formal requirements for a full professor, the issue of raising his pay at the university still dragged on and he was still unable to leave the Military Academy. In 1855, upon Gauss's death, the University of Göttingen decided to call Dirichlet as his successor. Given the difficulties faced in Berlin, he decided to accept the offer and immediately moved to Göttingen with his family. Kummer was called to assume his position as a professor of mathematics in Berlin.

Dirichlet enjoyed his time in Göttingen, as the lighter teaching load allowed him more time for research and he came into close contact with the new generation of researchers, especially Richard Dedekind and Bernhard Riemann. After moving to Göttingen he was able to obtain a small annual stipend for Riemann to retain him in the teaching staff there. Dedekind, Riemann, Moritz Cantor and Alfred Enneper, although they had all already earned their PhDs, attended Dirichlet's classes to study with him. Dedekind, who felt that there were gaps in his mathematics education, considered that the occasion to study with Dirichlet made him "a new human being". He later edited and published Dirichlet's lectures and other results in number theory under the title Vorlesungen über Zahlentheorie (Lectures on Number Theory).

In the summer of 1858, during a trip to Montreux, Dirichlet suffered a heart attack. On 5 May 1859, he died in Göttingen, several months after the death of his wife Rebecka. Dirichlet's brain is preserved in the department of physiology at the University of Göttingen, along with the brain of Gauss. The Academy in Berlin honored him with a formal memorial speech presented by Kummer in 1860, and later ordered the publication of his collected works edited by Kronecker and Lazarus Fuchs.

== Mathematics research ==
=== Number theory ===
Number theory was Dirichlet's main research interest, a field in which he found several deep results and in proving them introduced some fundamental tools, many of which were later named after him. In 1837, Dirichlet proved his theorem on arithmetic progressions using concepts from mathematical analysis to tackle an algebraic problem, thus creating the branch of analytic number theory. In proving the theorem, he introduced the Dirichlet characters and L-functions. In that article, he also noted the difference between the absolute and conditional convergence of series and its impact in what was later called the Riemann series theorem. In 1841, he generalized his arithmetic progressions theorem from integers to the ring of Gaussian integers $\mathbb{Z}[i]$.

In a couple of papers in 1838 and 1839, he proved the first class number formula for quadratic forms (later refined by his student Kronecker). The formula, which Jacobi called a result "touching the utmost of human acumen", opened the way for similar results regarding more general number fields. Based on his research of the structure of the unit group of quadratic fields, he proved the Dirichlet unit theorem, a fundamental result in algebraic number theory.

He first used the pigeonhole principle, a basic counting argument, in the proof of a theorem in diophantine approximation, later named after him Dirichlet's approximation theorem. He published important contributions to Fermat's Last Theorem, for which he proved the cases n = 5 and n = 14, and to the biquadratic reciprocity law. The Dirichlet divisor problem, for which he found the first results by introducing the Dirichlet hyperbola method, is still an unsolved problem in number theory despite later contributions by other mathematicians.

=== Analysis ===
Dirichlet found and proved the convergence conditions for Fourier series decomposition. Pictured: the first four Fourier series approximations for a square wave.

Inspired by the work of his mentor in Paris, Dirichlet published in 1829 a famous memoir giving the conditions, showing for which functions the convergence of the Fourier series holds. Before Dirichlet's solution, not only Fourier, but also Poisson and Cauchy had tried unsuccessfully to find a rigorous proof of convergence. The memoir pointed out Cauchy's mistake and introduced Dirichlet's test for the convergence of series. It also introduced the Dirichlet function as an example of a function that is not integrable (the definite integral was still a developing topic at the time) and, in the proof of the theorem for the Fourier series, introduced the Dirichlet kernel and the Dirichlet integral.

Dirichlet also studied the first boundary-value problem, for the Laplace equation, proving the uniqueness of the solution; this type of problem in the theory of partial differential equations was later named the Dirichlet problem after him. A function satisfying a partial differential equation subject to the Dirichlet boundary conditions must have fixed values on the boundary. In the proof he notably used the principle that the solution is the function that minimizes the so-called Dirichlet energy. Riemann later named this approach the Dirichlet principle, although he knew it had also been used by Gauss and by Lord Kelvin.

=== Introduction of the modern concept of function ===
While trying to gauge the range of functions for which convergence of the Fourier series can be shown, Dirichlet defines a function by the property that "to any x there corresponds a single finite y", but then restricts his attention to piecewise continuous functions. Based on this, he is credited with introducing the modern concept of a function, as opposed to the older vague understanding of a function as an analytic formula. Imre Lakatos cites Hermann Hankel as the early origin of this attribution, but disputes the claim saying that "there is ample evidence that he had no idea of this concept [...] for instance when he discusses piecewise continuous functions, he says that at points of discontinuity, the function has two values".

=== Other fields ===
Dirichlet also worked in mathematical physics, lecturing and publishing research in potential theory (including the Dirichlet problem and Dirichlet principle mentioned above), the theory of heat and hydrodynamics. He improved on Lagrange's work on conservative systems by showing that the condition for equilibrium is that the potential energy is minimal.

Dirichlet also lectured on probability theory and least squares, introducing some original methods and results, in particular for limit theorems and an improvement of Laplace's method of approximation related to the central limit theorem. The Dirichlet distribution and the Dirichlet process, based on the Dirichlet integral, are named after him.

== Honors ==
Dirichlet was elected as a member of several academies:

- Prussian Academy of Sciences (1832)
- Saint Petersburg Academy of Sciences (1833) – corresponding member
- Göttingen Academy of Sciences (1846)
- French Academy of Sciences (1854) – foreign member
- Royal Swedish Academy of Sciences (1854)
- Royal Belgian Academy of Sciences (1855)
- Royal Society (1855) – foreign member

In 1855 Dirichlet was awarded the civil class medal of the Pour le Mérite order at Alexander von Humboldt's recommendation. The Dirichlet crater on the Moon and the 11665 Dirichlet asteroid are named after him.

== Selected publications ==
- Lejeune Dirichlet, J.P.G. (1889). L. Kronecker (ed.). Werke. Vol. 1. Berlin: Reimer.
- Lejeune Dirichlet, J.P.G. (1897). L. Kronecker, L. Fuchs (ed.). Werke. Vol. 2. Berlin: Reimer.
- Lejeune Dirichlet, J.P.G.; Richard Dedekind (1863). Vorlesungen über Zahlentheorie. F. Vieweg und sohn.

A complete bibliography of Dirichlet's published works, including translations thereof and lectures not contained in the Werke, is available in:

- Merzbach, Uta C. (2018). Dirichlet: A Mathematical Biography. Springer. doi:10.1007/978-3-030-01073-7. ISBN 978-3-030-01071-3. MR 3887586. Zbl 1412.01003.
