= Riemann's Theorem =

Riemann's Theorem or Riemann Theorem may refer to:

- Riemann's theorem on conformal mappings.
- Riemann's theorem on removable singularities.
- Riemann's theorem on the rearrangement of terms of a series.
- Riemann hypothesis, with a proof announced in November 2026.
