= Dirichlet's test =

Test for series convergence

In mathematics, Dirichlet's test is a method of testing for the convergence of a series that is especially useful for proving conditional convergence. It is named after its author Peter Gustav Lejeune Dirichlet, and was published posthumously in the Journal de Mathématiques Pures et Appliquées in 1862.

== Statement ==
The test states that if $(a_n)$ is a monotonic sequence of real numbers with $\lim_{n \to \infty} a_n = 0$ and $(b_n)$ is a sequence of real numbers or complex numbers with bounded partial sums, then the series

$$\sum_{n=1}^{\infty} a_n b_n$$

converges.

== Proof ==
Let $S_n = \sum_{k=1}^n a_k b_k$ and $B_n = \sum_{k=1}^n b_k$.

From summation by parts, we have that $S_n = a_{n} B_n + \sum_{k=1}^{n-1} B_k (a_k - a_{k+1})$. Since the magnitudes of the partial sums $B_n$ are bounded by some M and $a_n \to 0$ as $n\to\infty$, the first of these terms approaches zero: $|a_{n} B_n| \leq |a_{n} M| \to 0$ as $n\to\infty$.

Furthermore, for each k, $|B_k (a_k - a_{k+1})| \leq M|a_k - a_{k+1}|$.

Since $(a_n)$ is monotone, it is either decreasing or increasing:

- If $(a_n)$ is decreasing,
  $$\sum_{k=1}^n M|a_k - a_{k+1}| = \sum_{k=1}^n M(a_k - a_{k+1}) = M\sum_{k=1}^n (a_k - a_{k+1}),$$
  which is a telescoping sum that equals $M(a_1 - a_{n+1})$ and therefore approaches $Ma_1$ as $n \to \infty$. Thus, $\sum_{k=1}^\infty M|a_k - a_{k+1}|$ converges.
- If $(a_n)$ is increasing,
  $$\sum_{k=1}^n M|a_k - a_{k+1}| = -\sum_{k=1}^n M(a_k - a_{k+1}) = -M\sum_{k=1}^n (a_k - a_{k+1}),$$
  which is again a telescoping sum that equals $-M(a_1 - a_{n+1})$ and therefore approaches $-Ma_1$ as $n\to\infty$. Thus, again, $\sum_{k=1}^\infty M|a_k - a_{k+1}|$ converges.

So, the series $\sum_{k=1}^\infty B_k(a_k - a_{k+1})$ converges by the direct comparison test to $\sum_{k=1}^\infty M|a_k - a_{k+1}|$. Hence $S_n$ converges.

== Applications ==
A particular case of Dirichlet's test is the more commonly used alternating series test for the case
$$b_n = (-1)^n \Longrightarrow\left|\sum_{n=1}^N b_n\right| \leq 1.$$

Another corollary is that $\sum_{n=1}^\infty a_n \sin n$ converges whenever $(a_n)$ is a decreasing sequence that tends to zero. To see that $\sum_{n=1}^N \sin n$ is bounded, we can use the summation formula
$$\sum_{n=1}^N\sin n=\sum_{n=1}^N\frac{e^{in}-e^{-in}}{2i}=\frac{\sum_{n=1}^N (e^{i})^n-\sum_{n=1}^N (e^{-i})^n}{2i}=\frac{\sin 1 +\sin N-\sin (N+1)}{2- 2\cos 1}.$$

== Improper integrals ==
An analogous statement for convergence of improper integrals is proven using integration by parts. If the integral of a function f is uniformly bounded over all intervals, and g is a bounded non-negative monotonically decreasing function, then the integral of fg is a convergent improper integral.
