= Convergent series =

Mathematical series with a finite sum

In mathematics, a series is the sum of the terms of an infinite sequence of numbers. More precisely, an infinite sequence $(a_1, a_2, a_3, \ldots)$ defines a series S that is denoted
$$S=a_1 + a_2 + a_3 + \cdots=\sum_{k=1}^\infty a_k.$$

The nth partial sum S_{n} is the sum of the first n terms of the sequence; that is,
$$S_n = a_1 +a_2  + \cdots + a_n = \sum_{k=1}^n a_k.$$

A series is convergent (or converges) if the sequence $(S_1, S_2, S_3, \dots)$ of its partial sums tends to a limit and that limit is finite; that means that, when adding one $a_k$ after the other in the order given by the indices, the partial sums approximate a number $\ell$. More precisely, for any given error tolerance, all but finitely many of the partial sums lie within that tolerance of the value $\ell$. If the series is convergent, the (necessarily unique) number $\ell$ is called the sum of the series.

The same notation
$$\sum_{k=1}^\infty a_k$$
is used for the series, and, if it is convergent, to its sum. This convention is similar to that which is used for addition: a + b denotes the operation of adding a and b as well as the result of this addition, which is called the sum of a and b.

Any series that is not convergent is said to be divergent or to diverge.

== Definition ==
The series above converges if there exists a number $\ell$ such that for every positive number $\varepsilon$, there is a (sufficiently large) integer $N$ such that for all $n \ge N$,

$$\left | S_n - \ell \right | < \varepsilon.$$

== Examples of convergent and divergent series ==
- The reciprocals of the positive integers produce a divergent series (harmonic series):
  $${1 \over 1}+{1 \over 2}+{1 \over 3}+{1 \over 4}+{1 \over 5}+{1 \over 6}+\cdots \to \infty.$$
- Alternating the signs of the reciprocals of positive integers produces a convergent series (alternating harmonic series):
  $${1 \over 1}-{1 \over 2}+{1 \over 3}-{1 \over 4}+{1 \over 5}-\cdots = \ln(2)$$
- The reciprocals of prime numbers produce a divergent series (so the set of primes is "large"; see divergence of the sum of the reciprocals of the primes):
  $${1 \over 2}+{1 \over 3}+{1 \over 5}+{1 \over 7}+{1 \over 11}+{1 \over 13}+\cdots \rightarrow \infty.$$
- The reciprocals of triangular numbers produce a convergent series:
  $${1 \over 1}+{1 \over 3}+{1 \over 6}+{1 \over 10}+{1 \over 15}+{1 \over 21}+\cdots = 2.$$
- The reciprocals of factorials produce a convergent series (see e):
  $$\frac{1}{1} + \frac{1}{1} + \frac{1}{2} + \frac{1}{6} + \frac{1}{24}  + \frac{1}{120} + \cdots = e.$$
- The reciprocals of square numbers produce a convergent series (the Basel problem):
  $${1 \over 1}+{1 \over 4}+{1 \over 9}+{1 \over 16}+{1 \over 25}+{1 \over 36}+\cdots = {\pi^2 \over 6}.$$
- The reciprocals of powers of 2 produce a convergent series (so the set of powers of 2 is "small"):
  $${1 \over 1}+{1 \over 2}+{1 \over 4}+{1 \over 8}+{1 \over 16}+{1 \over 32}+\cdots = 2.$$
- The reciprocals of powers of any n>1 produce a convergent series:
  $${1 \over 1}+{1 \over n}+{1 \over n^2}+{1 \over n^3}+{1 \over n^4}+{1 \over n^5}+\cdots = {n\over n-1}.$$
- Alternating the signs of reciprocals of powers of 2 also produces a convergent series:
  $${1 \over 1}-{1 \over 2}+{1 \over 4}-{1 \over 8}+{1 \over 16}-{1 \over 32}+\cdots = {2\over3}.$$
- Alternating the signs of reciprocals of powers of any n>1 produces a convergent series:
  $${1 \over 1}-{1 \over n}+{1 \over n^2}-{1 \over n^3}+{1 \over n^4}-{1 \over n^5}+\cdots = {n\over n+1}.$$
- The reciprocals of Fibonacci numbers produce a convergent series (see ψ):
  $$\frac{1}{1} +  \frac{1}{1} + \frac{1}{2} + \frac{1}{3} + \frac{1}{5} + \frac{1}{8} + \cdots = \psi.$$

== Convergence tests ==
There are a number of methods of determining whether a series converges or diverges.

If the blue series, $\Sigma b_n$, can be proven to converge, then the smaller series, $\Sigma a_n$ must converge. By contraposition, if the red series $\Sigma a_n$ is proven to diverge, then $\Sigma b_n$ must also diverge.

Comparison test. The terms of the sequence $\left \{ a_n \right \}$ are compared to those of another sequence $\left \{ b_n \right \}$. If, for all n, $0 \le \ a_n \le \ b_n$, and $\sum_{n=1}^\infty b_n$ converges, then so does $\sum_{n=1}^\infty a_n.$

However, if, for all n, $0 \le \ b_n \le \ a_n$, and $\sum_{n=1}^\infty b_n$ diverges, then so does $\sum_{n=1}^\infty a_n.$

Ratio test. Assume that for all n, $a_n$ is not zero. Suppose that there exists $r$ such that

$$\lim_{n \to \infty} \left|{\frac{a_{n+1}}{a_n}}\right| = r.$$

If r < 1, then the series is absolutely convergent. If r > 1, then the series diverges. If r = 1, the ratio test is inconclusive, and the series may converge or diverge.

Root test or nth root test. Suppose that the terms of the sequence in question are non-negative. Define r as follows:

$$r = \limsup_{n\to\infty} {\textstyle \sqrt[n]{|a_n|}},$$

where lim sup denotes the limit superior (possibly ∞; if the limit exists it is the same value).

If r < 1, then the series converges. If r > 1, then the series diverges. If r = 1, the root test is inconclusive, and the series may converge or diverge.

The ratio test and the root test are both based on comparison with a geometric series, and as such they work in similar situations. In fact, if the ratio test works (meaning that the limit exists and is not equal to 1) then so does the root test; the converse, however, is not true. The root test is therefore more generally applicable, but as a practical matter the limit is often difficult to compute for commonly seen types of series.

Integral test. The series can be compared to an integral to establish convergence or divergence. Let $f(n) = a_n$ be a positive and monotonically decreasing function. If

$$\int_{1}^{\infty} f(x)\, dx = \lim_{t \to \infty} \int_{1}^{t} f(x)\, dx < \infty,$$

then the series converges. But if the integral diverges, then the series does so as well.

Limit comparison test. If $\left \{ a_n \right \}, \left \{ b_n \right \} > 0$, and the limit $\lim_{n \to \infty} \frac{a_n}{b_n}$ exists and is not zero, then $\sum_{n=1}^\infty a_n$ converges if and only if $\sum_{n=1}^\infty b_n$ converges.

Alternating series test. Also known as the Leibniz criterion, the alternating series test states that for an alternating series of the form $\sum_{n=1}^\infty a_n (-1)^n$, if $\left \{ a_n \right \}$ is monotonically decreasing, and has a limit of 0 at infinity, then the series converges.

Cauchy condensation test. If $\left \{ a_n \right \}$ is a positive monotone decreasing sequence, then $\sum_{n=1}^\infty a_n$ converges if and only if $\sum_{k=1}^\infty 2^k a_{2^{k}}$ converges.

Dirichlet's test

Abel's test

== Conditional and absolute convergence ==
If the series $\sum_{n=1}^\infty \left| a_n \right|$ converges, then the series $\sum_{n=1}^\infty a_n$ is said to be absolutely convergent. Every absolute convergent series (real or complex) is also convergent, but the converse is not true. The Maclaurin series of the exponential function is absolutely convergent for every complex value of the variable.

If the series $\sum_{n=1}^\infty a_n$ converges but the series $\sum_{n=1}^\infty \left| a_n \right|$ diverges, then the series $\sum_{n=1}^\infty a_n$ is conditionally convergent. The Maclaurin series of the logarithm function $\ln(1+x)$ is conditionally convergent for x = 1 (see the Mercator series).

The Riemann series theorem states that if a series converges conditionally, it is possible to rearrange the terms of the series in such a way that the series converges to any value, or even diverges. Agnew's theorem characterizes rearrangements that preserve convergence for all series.

== Uniform convergence ==
Let $\left \{ f_1,\ f_2,\ f_3,\dots \right \}$ be a sequence of functions. The series $\sum_{n=1}^\infty f_n$ is said to converge uniformly to f if the sequence $\{s_n\}$ of partial sums defined by

$$s_n(x) = \sum_{k=1}^n f_k (x)$$

converges uniformly to f.

There is an analogue of the comparison test for infinite series of functions called the Weierstrass M-test.

== Cauchy convergence criterion ==
The Cauchy convergence criterion states that a series
$$\sum_{n=1}^\infty a_n$$
converges if and only if the sequence of partial sums is a Cauchy sequence. This means that for every $\varepsilon > 0,$ there is a positive integer $N$ such that for all $n \geq m \geq N$ we have
$$\Biggl| \sum_{k=m}^n a_k \Biggr| < \varepsilon.$$
This is equivalent to

$$\lim_{m \to \infty} \left(\sup_{n>m}\, \left| \sum_{k=m}^{n} a_k \right| \, \right) = 0.$$

== See also ==
- Normal convergence
- List of mathematical series
