= Vorlesungen über Zahlentheorie =

Several textbooks of number theory

Vorlesungen über Zahlentheorie (German pronunciation: [ˈfoːɐ̯ˌleːzʊŋən ˈyːbɐ ˈtsaːlənteoˌʁiː]; German for Lectures on Number Theory) is the name of several different textbooks of number theory. The best known was written by Peter Gustav Lejeune Dirichlet and Richard Dedekind, and published in 1863. Others were written by Leopold Kronecker, Edmund Landau, and Helmut Hasse. They all cover elementary number theory, Dirichlet's theorem, quadratic fields and forms, and sometimes more advanced topics.

== Dirichlet and Dedekind's book ==
Based on Dirichlet's number theory course at the University of Göttingen, the Vorlesungen were edited by Dedekind and published after Lejeune Dirichlet's death. Dedekind added several appendices to the Vorlesungen, in which he collected further results of Lejeune Dirichlet's and also developed his own original mathematical ideas.

=== Scope ===
The Vorlesungen cover topics in elementary number theory, algebraic number theory and analytic number theory, including modular arithmetic, quadratic congruences, quadratic reciprocity and binary quadratic forms.

=== Contents ===
The contents of Professor John Stillwell's 1999 translation of the Vorlesungen are as follows

Chapter 1. On the divisibility of numbers
Chapter 2. On the congruence of numbers
Chapter 3. On quadratic residues
Chapter 4. On quadratic forms
Chapter 5. Determination of the class number of binary quadratic forms
Supplement I. Some theorems from Gauss's theory of circle division
Supplement II. On the limiting value of an infinite series
Supplement III. A geometric theorem
Supplement IV. Genera of quadratic forms
Supplement V. Power residues for composite moduli
Supplement VI. Primes in arithmetic progressions
Supplement VII. Some theorems from the theory of circle division
Supplement VIII. On the Pell equation
Supplement IX. Convergence and continuity of some infinite series

This translation does not include Dedekind's Supplements X and XI in which he begins to develop the theory of ideals.

The German titles of supplements X and XI are:

Supplement X: Über die Composition der binären quadratische Formen (On the composition of binary quadratic forms)
Supplement XI: Über die Theorie der ganzen algebraischen Zahlen (On the theory of algebraic integers)

Chapters 1 to 4 cover similar ground to Gauss' Disquisitiones Arithmeticae, and Dedekind added footnotes which specifically cross-reference the relevant sections of the Disquisitiones. These chapters can be thought of as a summary of existing knowledge, although Dirichlet simplifies Gauss's presentation, and introduces his own proofs in some places.

Chapter 5 contains Dirichlet's derivation of the class number formula for real and imaginary quadratic fields. Although other mathematicians had conjectured similar formulae, Dirichlet gave the first rigorous proof.

Supplement VI contains Dirichlet's proof that an arithmetic progression of the form a+nd where a and d are coprime contains an infinite number of primes.

=== Importance ===
The Vorlesungen can be seen as a watershed between the classical number theory of Fermat, Jacobi and Gauss, and the modern number theory of Dedekind, Riemann and Hilbert. Dirichlet does not explicitly recognise the concept of the group that is central to modern algebra, but many of his proofs show an implicit understanding of group theory.

The Vorlesungen contains two key results in number theory which were first proved by Dirichlet. The first of these is the class number formulas for binary quadratic forms. The second is a proof that arithmetic progressions contain an infinite number of primes (known as Dirichlet's theorem); this proof introduces Dirichlet L-series. These results are important milestones in the development of analytic number theory.

== Kronecker's book ==
Leopold Kronecker's book was first published in 1901 in 2 parts and reprinted by Springer in 1978. It covers elementary and algebraic number theory, including Dirichlet's theorem.

== Landau's book ==
Edmund Landau's book Vorlesungen über Zahlentheorie was first published as a 3-volume set in 1927. The first half of volume 1 was published as Vorlesungen über Zahlentheorie. Aus der elementare Zahlentheorie in 1950, with an English translation in 1958 under the title Elementary number theory. In 1969 Chelsea republished the second half of volume 1 together with volumes 2 and 3 as a single volume.

Volume 1 on elementary and additive number theory includes the topics such as Dirichlet's theorem, Brun's sieve, binary quadratic forms, Goldbach's conjecture, Waring's problem, and the Hardy–Littlewood work on the singular series. Volume 2 covers topics in analytic number theory, such as estimates for the error in the prime number theorem, and topics in geometric number theory such as estimating numbers of lattice points. Volume 3 covers algebraic number theory, including ideal theory, quadratic number fields, and applications to Fermat's last theorem. Many of the results described by Landau were state of the art at the time but have since been superseded by stronger results.

== Hasse's book ==
Helmut Hasse's book Vorlesungen über Zahlentheorie was published in 1950, and is different from and more elementary than his book Zahlentheorie. It covers elementary number theory, Dirichlet's theorem, and quadratic fields.
