= Marie-Hélène Schwartz =

French mathematician (1913–2013)

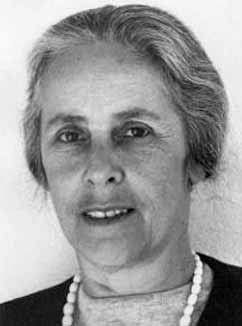
- Born: Marie-Hélène Lévy; 27 October 1913; Paris, France
- Died: 5 January 2013 (aged 99); Paris, France
- Education: Lycée Janson-de-Sailly, École Normale Supérieure
- Spouse: Laurent Schwartz
- Parent: Paul Lévy
- Scientific career
- Fields: Mathematics
- Workplaces: University of Lille
- Thesis: Formules apparentées à la formule de Gauss-Bonnet pour certaines applications d'une variété à n dimensions dans une autre (1954)

Marie-Hélène Schwartz (née Lévy, 27 October 1913 – 5 January 2013) was a French mathematician, known for her work on characteristic numbers of spaces with singularities. The Schwartz–MacPherson characteristic classes are named after her.

== Early life, education and marriage ==
Marie-Hélène Lévy was born in Paris on 27 October 1913 to Suzanne Lévy (1892-1973) and mathematician Paul Lévy. Her maternal great-grandfather was philologist Henri Weil. She had two younger siblings, Denise Piron (b. 1916) who became a professor of German at the lycée Molière and Jean Claude (b. 1918) who became a naval engineer.

After studying at the Lycée Janson-de-Sailly, she began studying mathematics at the École Normale Supérieure in 1934. She was the only woman in her class. However, she contracted pulmonary tuberculosis which forced her to drop out. She was sent for treatment in the Mont-Blanc sanatorium on the plateau d'Assy in Haute-Savoie where her doctor was Jacques Arnaud. He described her will to recover as "like a dragon". Her condition was considered dangerous and she was warned that marriage and children could cause a relapse.

In 1935 she became engaged to another Jewish mathematician, Laurent Schwartz. They corresponded daily during the eighteen months she spent in the Sanatorium, discussing mathematics and politics alongside the love letters. They both shared Trotskyist opinions in politics. They married in 1938, as soon as she was released from the sanatorium. They lived in Laon in Hauts-de-France, where Laurent Schwartz had been posted during his compulsory military service, then moved to Châtillon-sous-Bagneux when he was transferred to the Mont Valérien garrison.

Once World War II was declared, Laurent was called back up after the end of his military service and they lived in Ballancourt, then in Biscarrosse, Landes. In June 1940 the couple were evacuated to Aire-sur-l'Adour in advance of German troops. Laurent's health was affected by childhood polio and so he was demobilised in August 1940 and the couple joined Laurent's parents in Toulouse. There Marie-Hélène met Henri Cartan and sought his advice on restarting her academic career. He suggested the couple move to study at the University of Strasbourg which operated in Clermont-Ferrand following the Fall of France and German occupation. Schwartz resumed her research there and was able to publish her first paper.

By July 1942 Marie-Hélène Schwartz was pregnant. The German invasion of Vichy France on 11 November 1942 put the lives of the Jewish Trotskyist couple at risk. They had to move regularly for both their safety and that of their political contacts, and their home was raided and Schwartz was questioned. They also took on false identities, Marie-Hélène taking the surname Lengé and Laurent using Sélimartin. Following a difficult pregnancy, Schwartz gave birth to her son Marc-André in March 1943. She was advised to leave the newborn in the maternity hospital to avoid him potentially contracting TB from her. Whilst he was there, the Vichy police raided the hospital.

They had two children, Marc-André Schwartz (1943-1971) and Claudine Robert (1947) (née Schwartz), who became a professor of statistics at the University of Grenoble.

== Career ==
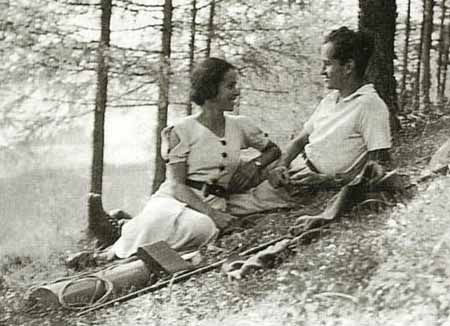
Marie-Hélène Schwartz with her husband

In autumn 1944, with the fall of the Vichy regime, Marie-Hélène and Laurent Schwartz moved back to Paris, and later to Grenoble and Nancy. She finished a thesis on generalisations of the Gauss–Bonnet formula in 1953. Her thesis was published in 1954 in two papers: the first two chapters as Formules apparentées à la formule de Gauss-Bonnet pour certaines applications d'une variété à n dimensions dans une autre, and the third chapter as Formules apparentées à celles de Nevanlinna-Ahlfors pour certaines applications d'une variété à n dimensions dans une autre.

In 1965, Schwartz introduced a notion of Chern classes for singular varieties. Independently a similar method was developed by Robert MacPherson to prove a conjecture by Pierre Deligne and Alexander Grothendieck, in 1974. Schwartz demonstrated the equivalence of her and MacPherson definitions in 1979, giving the name to the Schwartz–MacPherson classes. Additionally, the Chern–Schwartz–MacPherson classes are a generalization of their work.

Marie-Hélène Schwartz then taught at the University of Paris and the University of Reims Champagne-Ardenne. In 1964, she moved to the University of Lille, from where she retired in 1981.

== Recognition ==
A conference was held in Schwartz's honour in Lille in 1986, and a day of lectures in Paris honoured her 80th birthday in 1993, during which she presented a two-hour talk herself. She continued publishing mathematical research into her late 80s.

In 2026, Schwartz was announced as one of 72 historical women in STEM whose names have been proposed to be added to the 72 men already celebrated on the Eiffel Tower. The plan was announced by the Mayor of Paris, Anne Hidalgo following the recommendations of a committee led by Isabelle Vauglin of Femmes et Sciences and Jean-François Martins, representing the operating company which runs the Eiffel Tower.

== Selected publications ==
- Laurent Schwartz, Mme. (1941), "Exemple d'une fonction méromorphe ayant des valeurs déficientes non asymptotiques", Comptes Rendus Hebdomadaires des Séances de l'Académie des Sciences, 212: 382–384, MR 0004308
- Schwartz, Marie-Hélène (1949), "Sur les surfaces de Riemann possédant des points critiques arbitrairement rapprochés", Comptes Rendus Hebdomadaires des Séances de l'Académie des Sciences, 228: 154–155, MR 0028945
- Schwartz, Marie-Hélène (1949), "Sur les indices de ramification de M. Nevanlinna", Comptes Rendus Hebdomadaires des Séances de l'Académie des Sciences, 228: 45–46, MR 0028410
- Schwartz, Marie-Hélène (1950), "Applications intérieures régulières dans les variétés à n dimensions", Comptes Rendus Hebdomadaires des Séances de l'Académie des Sciences, 230: 1244–1245, MR 0035008
- Schwartz, M.-H. (1995), "Compte-rendu de travaux de M. Heins sur diverses majorations de la croissance des fonctions analytiques ou sous-harmoniques (Exp. No. 23)", Séminaire Bourbaki, vol. 1, Soc. Math. France, Paris, pp. 147–151, ISBN 2-85629-034-5, MR 1605157
- Schwartz, Marie-Hélène (1954), "Formules apparentées à la formule de Gauss-Bonnet pour certaines applications d'une variété à n dimensions dans une autre", Acta Mathematica, 91: 189–244, doi:10.1007/BF02393432, MR 0066721
- Schwartz, Marie-Hélène (1954), "Formules apparentées à celles de Nevanlinna-Ahlfors pour certaines applications d'une variété à n dimensions dans une autre", Bulletin de la Société Mathématique de France, 82: 317–360, doi:10.24033/bsmf.1452, MR 0068010
