= Lévy's modulus of continuity theorem =

Lévy's modulus of continuity theorem is a theorem that gives a result about an almost sure behaviour of an estimate of the modulus of continuity for Wiener process, that is used to model what's known as Brownian motion.

Lévy's modulus of continuity theorem is named after the French mathematician Paul Lévy.

== Statement of the result ==
Let $B : [0, 1] \times \Omega \to \mathbb{R}$ be a standard Wiener process. Then, almost surely,

$$\lim_{h \to 0} \sup_{t, t'\leq 1; |t-t'|\leq h } \frac{| B_{t'} - B_{t} |}{\sqrt{2 h \log (1 / h)}} = 1.$$

In other words, the sample paths of Brownian motion have modulus of continuity

$$\omega_{B} (\delta) = c\sqrt{2 \delta \log (1 / \delta)}$$

with probability one, for $c > 1$ and sufficiently small $\delta > 0$.

== See also ==
- Some properties of sample paths of the Wiener process
