= 1/2 + 1/4 + 1/8 + 1/16 + ⋯ =

Infinite series summable to 1

First six summands drawn as portions of a square.

The geometric series on the real line.

In mathematics, the infinite series 1/2 + 1/4 + 1/8 + 1/16 + ··· is an elementary example of a geometric series that converges absolutely. The sum of the series is 1. In summation notation, this may be expressed as

$$\frac12+\frac14+\frac18+\frac{1}{16}+\cdots = \sum_{n=1}^\infty \left({\frac 12}\right)^n = 1.$$

The series is related to philosophical questions considered in antiquity, particularly to Zeno's paradoxes.

== Proof ==
As with any infinite series, the sum

$$\frac12+\frac14+\frac18+\frac{1}{16}+\cdots$$

is defined to mean the limit of the partial sum of the first n terms

$$s_n=\frac12+\frac14+\frac18+\frac{1}{16}+\cdots+\frac{1}{2^{n-1}}+\frac{1}{2^n}$$

as n approaches infinity, if it exists. By various arguments, (Note: For example: multiplying s_{n} by 2 yields $2s_n = \frac22+\frac24+\frac28+\frac{2}{16}+\cdots+\frac{2}{2^n} = 1+\left[\frac12+\frac14+\frac18+\cdots+\frac{1}{2^{n-1}}\right] = 1+\left[s_n-\frac{1}{2^{n}}\right].$ Subtracting s_{n} from both sides, one concludes $s_n = 1-\frac{1}{2^{n}}.$ Other arguments might proceed by mathematical induction, or by adding $\frac{1}{2^n}$ to both sides of $s_n=\frac12+\frac14+\frac18+\frac{1}{16}+\cdots+\frac{1}{2^{n-1}}+\frac{1}{2^n}$ and manipulating to show that the right side of the result is equal to 1.) one can show that each finite sum is equal to

$$s_n = 1-\frac{1}{2^{n}},$$

and as n approaches infinity, the term $\frac{1}{2^{n}}$ approaches 0 and so s_{n} approaches 1.

== History ==
=== Zeno's paradox ===
This series was used as a representation of two of Zeno's paradoxes. For example, in the paradox of Achilles and the Tortoise, the warrior Achilles was to race against a tortoise. The track is 100 meters long. Achilles could run at 10 m/s, while the tortoise only 5. The tortoise, with a 10-meter advantage, Zeno argued, would win. Achilles would have to move 10 meters to catch up to the tortoise, but the tortoise would already have moved another five meters by then. Achilles would then have to move 5 meters, where the tortoise would move 2.5 meters, and so on. Zeno argued that the tortoise would always remain ahead of Achilles. Similarly, Zeno's dichotomy paradox arises from the supposition that to move a certain distance, one would have to move half of it, then half of the remaining distance, and so on, therefore having infinitely many time intervals.

In both cases, each time interval is a term of this infinite geometric series, and so even in the limit of infinite terms it would sum to a finite total time. This is sometimes considered to resolve Zeno's paradoxes. However, insofar as Zeno was concerned with the problems of division of a continuum into an actual infinity of sub-parts, rather than the problem of their sum, it may not address the philosophical heart of Zeno's argument.

=== The Eye of Horus ===
The parts of the Eye of Horus were once thought to represent the first six summands of the series.

=== In Zhuangzi ===
A version of the series appears in the ancient Taoist book Zhuangzi. The miscellaneous chapters "All Under Heaven" include the following sentence: "Take a chi long stick and remove half every day, in a myriad ages it will not be exhausted."

== See also ==
- 0.999...
- 1/2 − 1/4 + 1/8 − 1/16 + ⋯
- Actual infinity
