= John Craig (mathematician) =

Scottish mathematician and theologian

- Born: 1663; Hoddam, Dumfries, Scotland
- Died: 11 October 1731 (aged 67–68); High Holborn, London, England
- Education: University of Edinburgh
- Known for: Log-likelihood ratio
- Scientific career
- Fields: Mathematician
- Academic advisors: David Gregory

John Craig (1663 – 11 October 1731) was a Scottish mathematician and theologian.

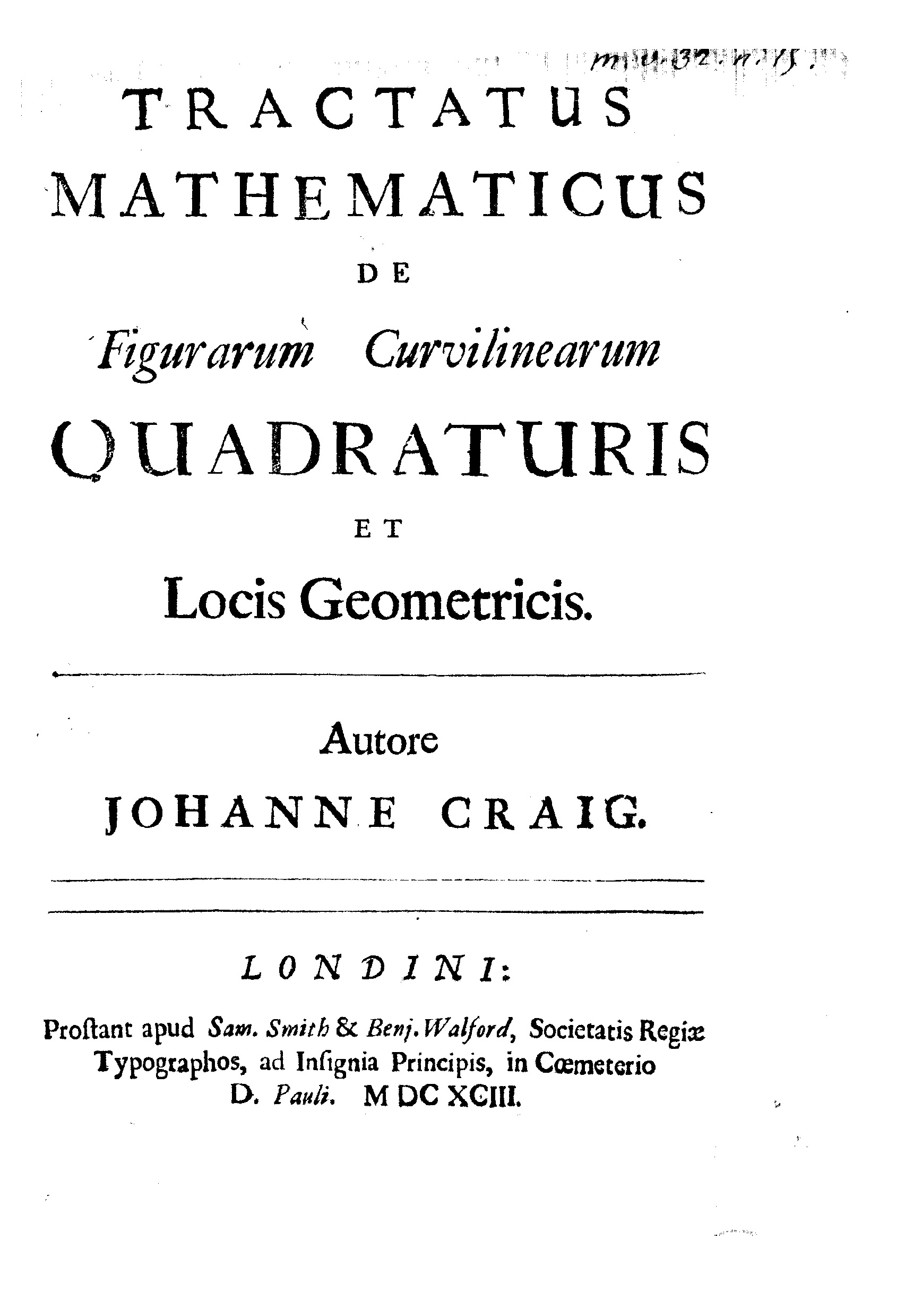
Tractatus mathematicus de figurarum curvilinearum quadraturis et locis geometricis, 1693

== Biography ==
Born in Dumfries and educated at the University of Edinburgh, Craig moved to England and became a vicar in the Church of England.

A friend of Isaac Newton, he wrote several minor works about the new calculus.

He was elected Fellow of the Royal Society in 1711.

== Mathematical Principles of Christian Theology ==
He is known for his book Theologiae Christianae Principia Mathematica (Mathematical Principles of Christian Theology), published in 1698.

In the aforementioned book, Craig presents a formula that describes how the probability of a historical event depends on the number of primary witnesses, on the chain of transmission through secondary witnesses, on the elapsed time and on the spatial distance. Using this formula, Craig derived that the probability of the story of Jesus would reach 0 in the year 3150. This year he interpreted as the Second Coming of Christ because of verse 18:8 in the Gospel of Luke.

His work was poorly received and controversial at the time. Several later mathematicians complained about his imprecise use of probability and the unsupported derivation of his formula. Stephen Stigler, in his 1999 book (see references, below) gave a more favorable interpretation, pointing out that some of Craig's reasoning can be justified if his "probability" is interpreted as the log-likelihood ratio.

== Logarithms ==
Craig was involved in developing the concept of Hyperbolic logarithm and in 1710 published “Logarithmotechnica generalis” in the Proceedings of the Royal Society. By way of illustration he gives the Mercator series for the logarithm (denoted l.) without mention of radius of convergence: “Exemplar 1. Assumatur a = y, unde per Canonum generalum $x = l.\overline{1+y},$ cujus differentials est $\dot{x} = \frac{\dot{y}}{1+y},$ & hujus integralis per Seriem infinitum expressa dat

$x = y - \frac{1}{2}y^2 + \frac{1}{3}y^3 - \frac{1}{4}y^4 + \frac{1}{5}y^5 - \frac{1}{6}y^6 + \frac{1}{7}y^7 ...$"

== Works ==
- 1698: Logarithmic quadrature (in Latin) Philosophical Transactions of the Royal Society
- 1703: Specimen of determining quadrature of figures (in Latin), Philosophical Transactions of the Royal Society #284 via Biodiversity Heritage Library
- 1710: Method of making logarithms (in Latin), Philosophical Transactions of the Royal Society

== Bibliography ==
- S. M. Stigler, Statistics on the Table, Chapter 13, Harvard University Press, (1999).
- J. F. Scott, Dictionary of Scientific Biography (New York 1970–1990).
- Dale, Andrew I. "Craig, John". Oxford Dictionary of National Biography (online ed.). Oxford University Press. doi:10.1093/ref:odnb/6577. (Subscription, Wikipedia Library access or UK public library membership required.). The first edition of this text is available at Wikisource: Stephen, Leslie, ed. (1887). "Craig, John (d.1731)" . Dictionary of National Biography. Vol. 12. London: Smith, Elder & Co.
- R. Nash, John Craige's mathematical principles of Christian theology (1991).
- M. Cantor, Vorlesungen über Geschichte der Mathematik III (Leipzig, 1896), 52, 188.
- Dictionary of National Biography (London, 1917).
- S. M. Stigler, John Craig and the probability of history: from the death of Christ to the birth of Laplace, Journal of the American Statistical Association 81 (1986), 879–887.
