= Mercator series =

Taylor series for the natural logarithm

Polynomial approximation to logarithm with n = 1, 2, 3, and 10 in the interval (0,2).

In mathematics, the Mercator series or Newton–Mercator series is the Taylor series for the natural logarithm:
$$\ln(1+x)=x-\frac{x^2}{2}+\frac{x^3}{3}-\frac{x^4}{4}+\cdots$$

In summation notation,
$$\ln(1+x)=\sum_{n=1}^\infty \frac{(-1)^{n+1}}{n} x^n.$$

The series converges to the natural logarithm (shifted by 1) whenever $-1<x\le 1$ .

== History ==
The series was discovered independently by Johannes Hudde (1656) and Isaac Newton (1665) but neither published the result. Nicholas Mercator also independently discovered it, and included values of the series for small values in his 1668 treatise Logarithmotechnia; the general series was included in John Wallis's 1668 review of the book in the Philosophical Transactions.

== Derivation ==
The series can be obtained by computing the Taylor series of $\ln (x)$ at $x=1$:
$$\ln (x)=(x-1)-\frac{(x-1)^2}{2}+\frac{(x-1)^3}{3}-\cdots,$$
and substituting all $x$ with $x + 1$. Alternatively, one can start with the finite geometric series ($t\ne -1$)
$$1-t+t^2-\cdots+(-t)^{n-1}=\frac{1-(-t)^n}{1+t}$$
which gives
$$\frac1{1+t}=1-t+t^2-\cdots+(-t)^{n-1}+\frac{(-t)^n}{1+t}.$$

It follows that
$$\int_0^x \frac{dt}{1+t}=\int_0^x \left(1-t+t^2-\cdots+(-t)^{n-1}+\frac{(-t)^n}{1+t}\right)\ dt$$
and by termwise integration,
$$\ln(1+x)=x-\frac{x^2}{2}+\frac{x^3}{3}-\cdots+(-1)^{n-1}\frac{x^n}{n}+(-1)^n \int_0^x \frac{t^n}{1+t}\ dt.$$

If $-1<x\le 1$ , the remainder term tends to 0 as $n\to\infty$.

This expression may be integrated iteratively k more times to yield
$$-xA_k(x)+B_k(x)\ln(1+x)=\sum_{n=1}^\infty (-1)^{n-1}\frac{x^{n+k}}{n(n+1)\cdots (n+k)},$$
where
$$A_k(x)=\frac1{k!}\sum_{m=0}^k{k\choose m}x^m\sum_{l=1}^{k-m}\frac{(-x)^{l-1}}{l}$$
and
$$B_k(x)=\frac1{k!}(1+x)^k$$
are polynomials in x.

== Special cases ==
Setting $x=1$ in the Mercator series yields the alternating harmonic series
$$\sum_{k=1}^\infty \frac{(-1)^{k+1}}{k}=\ln(2).$$

== Complex series ==
The complex power series
$$\sum_{n=1}^\infty \frac{z^n}{n}=z+\frac{z^2}{2}+\frac{z^3}{3}+\frac{z^4}{4}+\cdots$$
is the Taylor series for $-\log(1-z)$ , where log denotes the principal branch of the complex logarithm. This series converges precisely for all complex number $|z|\le 1,z\ne 1$. In fact, as seen by the ratio test, it has radius of convergence equal to 1, therefore converges absolutely on every disk B(0, r) with radius r < 1. Moreover, it converges uniformly on every nibbled disk $\overline{B(0,1)}\setminus B(1,\delta)$, with δ > 0. This follows at once from the algebraic identity:
$$(1-z)\sum_{n=1}^m \frac{z^n}{n}=z-\sum_{n=2}^m \frac{z^n}{n(n-1)}-\frac{z^{m+1}}{m},$$
observing that the right-hand side is uniformly convergent on the whole closed unit disk.

== See also ==
- John Craig
- Natural logarithm plus 1
