= 1/2 − 1/4 + 1/8 − 1/16 + ⋯ =

Infinite series summable to 1/3

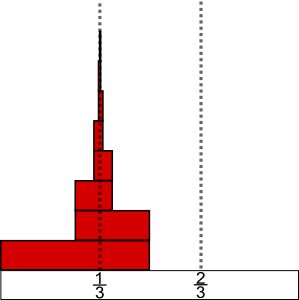
Demonstration that 1/2 − 1/4 + 1/8 − 1/16 + ⋯ = 1/3

In mathematics, the infinite series 1/2 − 1/4 + 1/8 − 1/16 + ⋯ is a simple example of an alternating series that converges absolutely.

It is a geometric series whose first term is 1/2 and whose common ratio is −1/2, so its sum is

$$\sum_{n=1}^\infty \frac{(-1)^{n+1}}{2^n}=\frac12-\frac14+\frac18-\frac{1}{16}+\cdots=\frac{\frac12}{1-(-\frac12)} = \frac13.$$

== Hackenbush and the surreals ==
Demonstration of 2/3 via a zero-value game

A slight rearrangement of the series reads

$$1-\frac12-\frac14+\frac18-\frac{1}{16}+\cdots=\frac13.$$

The series has the form of a positive integer plus a series containing every negative power of two with either a positive or negative sign, so it can be translated into the infinite blue-red Hackenbush string that represents the surreal number 1/3:

LRRLRLR... = 1/3.

A slightly simpler Hackenbush string eliminates the repeated R:

LRLRLRL... = 2/3.

In terms of the Hackenbush game structure, this equation means that the board depicted on the right has a value of 0; whichever player moves second has a winning strategy.

== Related series ==
- The statement that 1/2 − 1/4 + 1/8 − 1/16 + ⋯ is absolutely convergent means that the series 1/2 + 1/4 + 1/8 + 1/16 + ⋯ is convergent. In fact, the latter series converges to 1, and it proves that one of the binary expansions of 1 is 0.111....
- Pairing up the terms of the series 1/2 − 1/4 + 1/8 − 1/16 + ⋯ results in another geometric series with the same sum, 1/4 + 1/16 + 1/64 + 1/256 + ⋯. This series is one of the first to be summed in the history of mathematics; it was used by Archimedes circa 250–200 BC.
- The Euler transform of the divergent series 1 − 2 + 4 − 8 + ⋯ is 1/2 − 1/4 + 1/8 − 1/16 + ⋯. Therefore, even though the former series does not have a sum in the usual sense, it is Euler summable to 1/3.
