= Universal chord theorem =

Guarantees chords of length 1/n exist for functions satisfying certain conditions

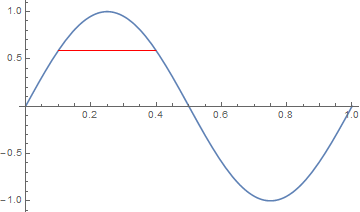
A chord (in red) of length 0.3 on a sinusoidal function. The universal chord theorem guarantees the existence of chords of length 1/n for functions satisfying certain conditions.

In mathematical analysis, the universal chord theorem states that if a function f is continuous on [a,b] and satisfies $f(a) = f(b)$, then for every natural number $n$, there exists some $x \in [a,b]$ such that $f(x) = f\left(x + \frac{b-a}{n}\right)$.

== History ==
The theorem was published by Paul Lévy in 1934 as a generalization of Rolle's theorem.

== Statement of the theorem ==
Let $H(f) = \{ h \in [0, +\infty) : f(x) = f(x+h) \text{ for some } x \}$ denote the chord set of the function f. If f is a continuous function and $h \in H(f)$, then $\frac h n \in H(f)$ for all natural numbers n.

== Case of n = 2 ==
The case when n = 2 can be considered an application of the Borsuk–Ulam theorem to the real line. It says that if $f(x)$ is continuous on some interval $I = [a,b]$ with the condition that $f(a) = f(b)$, then there exists some $x \in [a,b]$ such that $f(x) = f\left(x + \frac{b-a}{2}\right)$.

In less generality, if $f : [0,1] \rightarrow \R$ is continuous and $f(0) = f(1)$, then there exists $x \in \left[0,\frac{1}{2}\right]$ that satisfies $f(x) = f(x+1/2)$.

== Proof of n = 2 ==
Consider the function $g:\left[a, \dfrac{b+a}{2}\right]\to\mathbb{R}$ defined by $g(x) = f\left(x+\dfrac{b-a}{2}\right) - f(x)$. Being the sum of two continuous functions, $g$ is continuous, $g(a) + g\left(\dfrac{b+a}{2}\right) = f(b) - f(a) = 0$. It follows that $g(a)\cdot g\left(\dfrac{b+a}{2}\right)\le 0$ and by applying the intermediate value theorem, there exists $c\in \left[a, \dfrac{b+a}{2}\right]$ such that $g(c) = 0$, so that $f(c) = f\left(c + \dfrac{b-a}{2}\right)$. This concludes the proof of the theorem for $n = 2$.

== Proof of general case ==
The proof of the theorem in the general case is very similar to the proof for $n = 2$ Let $n$ be a non negative integer, and consider the function $g:\left[a, b - \dfrac{b-a}{n}\right]\to\mathbb{R}$ defined by $g(x) = f\left(x + \dfrac{b-a}{n}\right) - f(x)$. Being the sum of two continuous functions, $g$ is continuous. Furthermore, $\sum_{k=0}^{n-1}g\left(a+k\cdot\dfrac{b-a}{n}\right) = 0$. It follows that there exists integers $i,j$ such that $g\left(a+i\cdot\dfrac{b-a}{n}\right)\le 0\le g\left(a+j\cdot\dfrac{b-a}{n}\right)$ The intermediate value theorems gives us c such that $g(c)=0$ and the theorem follows.

== Counterexample for non-integer n ==
Let $r \in \mathbb{R}$ be arbitrary, and consider the function $f : [0, 1] \to \mathbb{R}$ defined by $f(x) = \sin^2\left(\frac{\pi x}{r}\right) - x\sin^2\left(\frac{\pi}{r}\right)$. It is immediate that $f$ is continuous, and $f(0) = f(1) = 0$. If some $x \in [0, 1]$ satisfies $f(x) = f(x + r)$, then $r\sin^2\left(\frac{\pi}{r}\right) = 0$ which implies that $r = \frac{1}{n}$ for some integer $n$. Therefore the theorem does not hold for non-integer values of $n$.
