= Unconditional convergence =

Order-independent convergence of a sequence

In mathematics, specifically functional analysis, a series is unconditionally convergent if all reorderings of the series converge to the same value. In contrast, a series is conditionally convergent if it converges but different orderings do not all converge to that same value. Unconditional convergence is equivalent to absolute convergence in finite-dimensional vector spaces, but is a weaker property in infinite dimensions.

== Definition ==
Let $X$ be a topological vector space. Let $I$ be an index set and $x_i \in X$ for all $i \in I.$

The series $\textstyle \sum_{i \in I} x_i$ is called unconditionally convergent to $x \in X,$ if

- the indexing set $I_0 := \left\{i \in I : x_i \neq 0\right\}$ is countable, and
- for every permutation (bijection) $\sigma : I_0 \to I_0$ of $I_0 = \left\{i_k\right\}_{k=1}^\infty$ the following relation holds: $\sum_{k=1}^\infty x_{\sigma\left(i_k\right)} = x.$

== Alternative definition ==
Unconditional convergence is often defined in an equivalent way: A series is unconditionally convergent if for every sequence $\left(\varepsilon_n\right)_{n=1}^\infty,$ with $\varepsilon_n \in \{-1, +1\},$ the series $\sum_{n=1}^\infty \varepsilon_n x_n$ converges.

If $X$ is a Banach space, every absolutely convergent series is unconditionally convergent, but the converse implication does not hold in general. Indeed, if $X$ is an infinite-dimensional Banach space, then by Dvoretzky–Rogers theorem there always exists an unconditionally convergent series in this space that is not absolutely convergent. However, when $X = \R^n,$ by the Riemann series theorem, the series $\sum_n x_n$ is unconditionally convergent if and only if it is absolutely convergent.

== See also ==
- Absolute convergence – Mode of convergence of an infinite series
- Modes of convergence (annotated index) – Annotated index of various modes of convergence
- Rearrangements and unconditional convergence/Dvoretzky–Rogers theorem – Mode of convergence of an infinite series
- Riemann series theorem – Unconditionally convergent series converge absolutely
