= Lévy's stochastic area =

In probability theory, Lévy's stochastic area is a stochastic process that describes the enclosed area of a trajectory of a two-dimensional Brownian motion and its chord. The process was introduced by Paul Lévy in 1940, and in 1950 he computed the characteristic function and conditional characteristic function.

The process has many unexpected connections to other objects in mathematics such as the soliton solutions of the Korteweg–De Vries equation and the Riemann zeta function. In the Malliavin calculus, the process can be used to construct a process that is smooth in the sense of Malliavin but that has no continuous modification with respect to the Banach norm.

== Lévy's stochastic area ==
Let $W=(W_s^{(1)},W_s^{(2)})_{s\geq 0}$ be a two-dimensional Brownian motion in $\mathbb{R}^2$ then Lévy's stochastic area is the process

$$S(t,W)=\frac{1}{2}\int_0^t \left(W_s^{(1)}dW_s^{(2)}-W_s^{(2)}dW_s^{(1)}\right),$$

where the Itō integral is used.

Define the 1-Form $\vartheta=\tfrac{1}{2}(x^1dx^2-x^2dx^1)$ then $S(t,W)$ is the stochastic integral of $\vartheta$ along the curve $\varphi:[0,t]\to \R^2, s\mapsto (W_s^{(1)},W_s^{(2)})$

$S(t,W)=\int_{W[0,t]} \vartheta.$

=== Area formula ===
Let $x=(x_1,x_2)\in \R^2$, $a\in \R$, $b=at/2$ and $S_t=S(t,W)$ then Lévy computed

$$\mathbb{E}[\exp(iaS_t)]=\frac{1}{\cosh(b)}$$

and

$$\mathbb{E}[\exp(iaS_t)\mid W_t=x]=\frac{b}{\sinh(b)}\exp\left(\frac{\|x\|_2}{2t}\left(1-b\coth\left(b\right)\right)\right),$$

where $\|x\|_2$ is the Euclidean norm.

== Further topics ==
- In 1980 Yor found a short probabilistic proof.
- In 1983 Helmes and Schwane found a higher-dimensional formula.
