= Richard Johnsonbaugh =

American mathematician

Richard F. Johnsonbaugh (born 1941) is an American mathematician and computer scientist. His interests include discrete mathematics and the history of mathematics. He is the author of several textbooks.

Johnsonbaugh earned a bachelor's degree in mathematics from Yale University, and then moved to the University of Oregon for graduate study. He completed his Ph.D. at Oregon in 1969. His dissertation, I. Classical Fundamental Groups and Covering Space Theory in the Setting of Cartan and Chevalley; II. Spaces and Algebras of Vector-Valued Differentiable Functions, was supervised by Bertram Yood. He also has a second master's degree in computer science from the University of Illinois at Chicago.

He is currently professor emeritus at De Paul University.

== Books ==
- Discrete Mathematics (MacMillan, 1984; 8th ed., Pearson, 2018)
- Foundations of Mathematical Analysis (with W. E. Pfaffenberger, Marcel Dekker, 1981; Dover, 2010)
- Applications Programming in ANSI C (with Martin Kalin, Prentice Hall, 1993; 3rd ed., 1996)
- Object-oriented Programming in C++ (with Martin Kalin, Prentice Hall, 1995)
- Algorithms (with Marcus Schaefer, Prentice Hall, 2003)
