= Paul Lévy (mathematician) =

French mathematician (1886-1971)

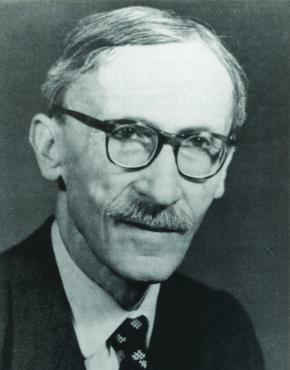
- Paul Pierre Lévy
- Born: 15 September 1886; Paris, France
- Died: 15 December 1971 (aged 85); Paris, France
- Education: University of Paris
- Known for: Additive process; Brownian excursion; Concentration of measure; Martingale (probability theory); Universal chord theorem; Lévy alpha-stable distribution; Lévy's arcsine law; Lévy C curve; Lévy's constant; Lévy characterisation; Lévy's continuity theorem; Lévy distribution; Lévy flight; Lévy's local time; Lévy measure; Lévy's modulus of continuity theorem; Lévy process; Lévy's zero–one law; Lévy–Khintchine representation; Lévy–Prokhorov metric; Lévy–Steinitz theorem; Lindeberg–Lévy CLT; Wiener–Lévy theorem
- Awards: Émile Picard Medal of the French Academy of Sciences (1953)
- Scientific career
- Fields: Mathematics
- Workplaces: École Polytechnique; École des Mines
- Doctoral advisor: Jacques Hadamard; Vito Volterra
- Doctoral students: Wolfgang Doeblin; Michel Loève; Benoît Mandelbrot; Georges Matheron

Paul Pierre Lévy (French pronunciation: [pɔl pjɛʁ levi]; 15 September 1886 – 15 December 1971) was a French mathematician who was active especially in probability theory, introducing fundamental concepts such as local time, stable distributions and characteristic functions. Lévy processes, Lévy flights, Lévy measures, Lévy's constant, the Lévy distribution, the Lévy area, the Lévy arcsine law, and the fractal Lévy C curve are named after him.

== Biography ==
Lévy was born in Paris to a Jewish family which already included several mathematicians. His father Lucien Lévy was an examiner at the École Polytechnique. Lévy attended the École Polytechnique and published his first paper in 1905, at the age of nineteen, while still an undergraduate, in which he introduced the Lévy–Steinitz theorem. His teacher and advisor was Jacques Hadamard. After graduation, he spent a year in military service and then studied for three years at the École des Mines, where he became a professor in 1913.

During World War I Lévy conducted mathematical analysis work for the French Artillery. In 1920 he was appointed Professor of Analysis at the École Polytechnique, where his students included Benoît Mandelbrot and Georges Matheron.

After the German invasion and occupation of France in June 1940, the Nazis moved the École Polytechnique to Lyon, and Lévy moved to Lyon to continue teaching. On 3 October 1940 the Vichy government enacted a law that required all Jewish faculty be fired. Lévy received his termination notice 19 December 1940, but the director of the École Polytechnique got Lévy reinstated by 14 March 1941. Increasing Nazi oppression prompted Lévy to flee Lyon and go live in hiding with his son-in-law Robert Piron, in Montbonnot, just one week before the German invasion of Vichy France on 11 November 1942. In hiding until the Allied liberation of France, Lévy continued his mathematics work. After the war, Lévy returned to the École Polytechnique in Paris and remained there until his retirement in 1959.

Lévy made many fundamental contributions to probability theory and the nascent theory of stochastic processes. He introduced the notion of 'stable distribution' which share the property of stability under addition of independent variables and proved a general version of the Central Limit theorem, recorded in his 1937 book Théorie de l'addition des variables aléatoires, using the notion of characteristic function. He also introduced, independently from Aleksandr Khinchin, the notion of infinitely divisible law and derived their characterization through the Lévy–Khintchine representation.

In the 1930s, while investigating conditions under which the law of large numbers remained valid for dependent random variables, Lévy introduced the concept now known as a martingale. He considered partial sums $S_n$ satisfying

$$\operatorname{E}(S_{n+1}\mid S_1,S_2,\ldots,S_n)=S_n,$$

and used this conditional-expectation property to obtain almost-sure convergence results. Joseph L. Doob subsequently developed martingales into a general and widely applicable theory.

His 1948 monograph on Brownian motion, Processus stochastiques et mouvement brownien, contains a wealth of new concepts and results, including the Lévy area, the Lévy arcsine law, the local time of a Brownian path, and many other results.

Lévy received a number of honours, including membership at the French Academy of Sciences and honorary membership at the London Mathematical Society.

== Personal life ==
In 1913 Lévy married Suzanne Lévy (1892-1973). Her maternal grandfather was philologist Henri Weil. The couple had three children, Marie-Hélène in 1913, Denise in 1916 and Jean Claude in 1918. Marie-Hélène Schwartz and her husband Laurent Schwartz were also notable mathematicians. Denise married Robert Piron, an engineer, and worked as a professor of German at the lycée Molière. Jean Claude became a naval engineer.

== Works ==
- 1922 – Leçons d'analyse Fonctionnelle
- 1925 – Calcul des probabilités
- 1937 – Théorie de l'addition des variables aléatoires
- 1948 – Processus stochastiques et mouvement brownien
- 1954 – Le mouvement brownien

== See also ==
- Cramér's decomposition theorem
- Lévy distribution
- Lévy metric
- Lévy's modulus of continuity
- Lévy–Prokhorov metric
- Lévy's continuity theorem
- Lévy's zero-one law
- Concentration of measure
- Lévy process
- Lévy–Khintchine representation
- Lévy–Itô decomposition
- Lévy flight
- local time
- Isoperimetric inequality on a sphere
- Lévy's characterisation of Brownian motion
