= Conditional convergence =

Property of infinite series

In mathematics, a series or integral is said to be conditionally convergent if it converges, but it does not converge absolutely.

== Definition ==
More precisely, a series of real numbers $\sum_{n=0}^\infty a_n$ is said to converge conditionally if $\lim_{m\rightarrow\infty}\,\sum_{n=0}^m a_n$ exists (as a finite real number, i.e. not $\infty$ or $-\infty$), but $\sum_{n=0}^\infty \left|a_n\right| = \infty.$

A classic example is the alternating harmonic series given by
$$1 - {1 \over 2} + {1 \over 3} - {1 \over 4} + {1 \over 5} - \cdots =\sum\limits_{n=1}^\infty {(-1)^{n+1}  \over n},$$
which converges to $\ln (2)$, but is not absolutely convergent (see Harmonic series).

Bernhard Riemann proved that a conditionally convergent series may be rearranged to converge to any value at all, including ∞ or −∞; see Riemann series theorem. Agnew's theorem describes rearrangements that preserve convergence for all convergent series.

The Lévy–Steinitz theorem identifies the set of values to which a series of terms in R^{n} can converge.

Indefinite integrals may also be conditionally convergent. A typical example of a conditionally convergent integral is (see Fresnel integral)
$$\int_{0}^{\infty} \sin(x^2) dx,$$
where the integrand oscillates between positive and negative values indefinitely, but enclosing smaller areas each time.

== See also ==
- Absolute convergence
- Unconditional convergence
