= Lévy–Steinitz theorem =

In mathematics, the Lévy–Steinitz theorem identifies the set of values to which sums of rearrangements of an infinite series of vectors in R^{n} can converge. It was proved by Paul Lévy in his first published paper when he was 19 years old. In 1913 Ernst Steinitz filled in a gap in Lévy's proof and also proved the result by a different method.

In an expository article, Peter Rosenthal stated the theorem in the following way.

The set of all sums of rearrangements of a given series of vectors in a finite-dimensional real Euclidean space is either the empty set or a translate of a linear subspace (i.e., a set of the form v + M, where v is a given vector and M is a linear subspace).

== See also ==
- Riemann series theorem
