= Cauchy's convergence test =

Criterion for infinite series

The Cauchy convergence test is a method used to test infinite series for convergence. It relies on bounding sums of terms in the series. This convergence criterion is named after Augustin-Louis Cauchy who published it in his textbook Cours d'Analyse 1821.

== Statement ==
A series $\sum_{i=0}^\infty a_i$ is convergent if and only if for every $\varepsilon>0$ there is a natural number $N$ such that

$$|a_{n+1}+a_{n+2}+\cdots+a_{n+p}|<\varepsilon$$

holds for all $n > N$ and all $p \geq 1$.

== Explanation ==
(a) The plot of a Cauchy sequence $(x_n),$ shown in blue, as $x_n$ versus $n$. If the space containing the sequence is complete, the "ultimate destination" of this sequence (that is, the limit) exists.

(b) A sequence that is not Cauchy. The elements of the sequence fail to get arbitrarily close to each other as the sequence progresses.

The theorem states that the values near the beginning of an infinite series can be ignored for determining convergence. Even if the initial values are extremely large, the convergence of the series depends more on the ultimate behavior of $a_n$ as $n$ approaches infinity.

The test works because the space $\R$ of real numbers and the space $\C$ of complex numbers (with the metric given by the absolute value) are both complete. From here, the series is convergent if and only if the partial sums

$$s_n := \sum_{i=0}^n a_i$$

are a Cauchy sequence.

Cauchy's convergence test can only be used in complete metric spaces (such as $\R$ and $\C$), which are spaces where all Cauchy sequences converge. This is because we need only show that its elements become arbitrarily close to each other after a finite progression in the sequence to prove the series converges.

== Proof ==
We can use the results about convergence of the sequence of partial sums of the infinite series and apply them to the convergence of the infinite series itself. The Cauchy Criterion test is one such application. For any real sequence $a_k$, the above results on convergence imply that the infinite series

$$\sum_{k=1}^\infty a_k$$

converges if and only if for every $\varepsilon>0$ there is a number N, such that m ≥ n ≥ N imply

$|s_m-s_n| = \left|\sum_{k=n+1}^m a_k\right| < \varepsilon.$

Probably the most interesting part of this theorem is that the Cauchy condition implies the existence of the limit: this is indeed related to the completeness of the real line. The Cauchy criterion can be generalized to a variety of situations, which can all be loosely summarized as "a vanishing oscillation condition is equivalent to convergence".
