= Agnew's theorem =

Theorem about permutations that preserve convergence for all converging series

Agnew's theorem, proposed by American mathematician Ralph Palmer Agnew, characterizes reorderings of terms of infinite series that preserve convergence for all series.

== Statement ==
We call a permutation $p: \mathbb{N} \to \mathbb{N}$ an Agnew permutation (Note: This terminology is used only in this article, to simplify the explanation.) if there exists $K \in \mathbb{N}$ such that any interval that starts with 1 is mapped by p to a union of at most K intervals, i.e., $\exists K \in \mathbb{N} \, : \; \forall n \in \mathbb{N} \;\; \#_{[\,]}(p([1,\,n])) \le K\,$, where $\#_{[\,]}$ counts the number of intervals.

Agnew's theorem. $p$ is an Agnew permutation $\iff$ for all converging series of real or complex terms $\sum_{i=1}^\infty a_i\,$, the series $\sum_{i=1}^\infty a_{p(i)}$ converges to the same sum.

Corollary 1. $p^{-1}$ (the inverse of $p$) is an Agnew permutation $\implies$ for all diverging series of real or complex terms $\sum_{i=1}^\infty a_i\,$, the series $\sum_{i=1}^\infty a_{p(i)}$ diverges. (Note: Note that, unlike Agnew's theorem, the corollaries in this article do not specify equivalence, only implication.)

Corollary 2. $p$ and $p^{-1}$ are Agnew permutations $\implies$ for all series of real or complex terms $\sum_{i=1}^\infty a_i\,$, the convergence type of the series $\sum_{i=1}^\infty a_{p(i)}$ is the same. (Note: Absolutely converging series turn into absolutely converging series, conditionally converging series turn into conditionally converging series (with the same sum), diverging series turn into diverging series.)

== Usage ==
Agnew's theorem is useful when the convergence of $\sum_{i=1}^\infty a_i$ has already been established: any Agnew permutation can be used to rearrange its terms while preserving convergence to the same sum.

The Corollary 2 is useful when the convergence type of $\sum_{i=1}^\infty a_i$ is unknown: the convergence type of $\sum_{i=1}^\infty a_{p(i)}$ is the same as that of the original series.

== Examples ==
An important class of permutations is infinite compositions of permutations $p=\cdots \circ p_k \circ \cdots \circ p_1$ in which each constituent permutation $p_k$ acts only on its corresponding interval $[g_k+1,\,g_{k+1}]$ (with $g_1=0$). Since $p([1,\,n]) = [1,\,g_k] \cup p_k([g_k+1,\,n])$ for $g_k+1 \le n < g_{k+1}$, we only need to consider the behavior of $p_k$ as $n$ increases.

=== Bounded groups of consecutive terms ===
When the sizes of all groups of consecutive terms are bounded by a constant, i.e., $g_{k+1}-g_k \le L\,$, $p$ and its inverse are Agnew permutations (with $K = \left\lfloor\frac{L}{2}\right\rfloor$), i.e., arbitrary reorderings can be applied within the groups with the convergence type preserved.

=== Unbounded groups of consecutive terms ===
When the sizes of groups of consecutive terms grow without bounds, it is necessary to look at the behavior of $p_k$.

Mirroring permutations and circular shift permutations, as well as their inverses, add at most 1 interval to the main interval $[1,\,g_k]$, hence $p$ and its inverse are Agnew permutations (with $K = 2$), i.e., mirroring and circular shifting can be applied within the groups with the convergence type preserved.

A block reordering permutation with B > 1 blocks (Note: The case of B = 2 is a circular shift.) and its inverse add at most $\left\lceil\frac{B}{2}\right\rceil$ intervals (when $g_{k+1}-g_k$ is large) to the main interval $[1,\,g_k]$, hence $p$ and its inverse are Agnew permutations, i.e., block reordering can be applied within the groups with the convergence type preserved.

A permutation $p_k$ mirroring the elements of its interval $[g_k+1,\,g_{k+1}]$

A permutation $p_k$ circularly shifting to the right by 2 positions the elements of its interval $[g_k+1,\,g_{k+1}]$

A permutation $p_k$ reordering the elements of its interval $[g_k+1,\,g_{k+1}]$ as three blocks
