= Harmonic series =

Harmonic series may refer to either of two related concepts:

- Harmonic series (mathematics)
- Harmonic series (music)
