= Harmonic progression =

Harmonic progression may refer to:

- Chord progression in music
- Harmonic progression (mathematics)
- Sequence (music)
