= Harmonic number =

Sum of the first n whole number reciprocals; 1/1 + 1/2 + 1/3 + ... + 1/n

The harmonic number $H_n$ with $n=\lfloor x \rfloor$ (red line) with its asymptotic limit $\gamma+\ln(x)$ (blue line) where $\gamma$ is the Euler–Mascheroni constant.

In mathematics, the n-th harmonic number is the sum of the reciprocals of the first n natural numbers:
$$H_n= 1+\frac{1}{2}+\frac{1}{3}+\cdots+\frac{1}{n} =\sum_{k=1}^n \frac{1}{k}.$$

Starting from n = 1, the sequence of harmonic numbers begins:
$$1, \frac{3}{2}, \frac{11}{6}, \frac{25}{12}, \frac{137}{60}, \dots$$

Harmonic numbers are related to the harmonic mean in that the n-th harmonic number is also n times the reciprocal of the harmonic mean of the first n positive integers.

Harmonic numbers have been studied since antiquity and are important in various branches of number theory. They are sometimes loosely termed harmonic series, are closely related to the Riemann zeta function, and appear in the expressions of various special functions.

The harmonic numbers roughly approximate the natural logarithm function and thus the associated harmonic series grows without limit, albeit slowly. In 1737, Leonhard Euler used the divergence of the harmonic series to provide a new proof of the infinity of prime numbers. His work was extended into the complex plane by Bernhard Riemann in 1859, leading directly to the celebrated Riemann hypothesis about the distribution of prime numbers.

When the value of a large quantity of items has a Zipf's law distribution, the total value of the n most-valuable items is proportional to the n-th harmonic number. This leads to a variety of surprising conclusions regarding the long tail and the theory of network value.

Counting the number of factors 2 in the numerator and denominator of the harmonic numbers written as a fraction shows that, except for the case n = 1, the harmonic numbers have even denominators and thus are never integers. The Bertrand-Chebyshev theorem can also be used to show that the denominator of the nth harmonic number is divisible by the largest prime not larger than n.

== List ==
The first 40 harmonic numbers, H_{n}
n
n	H_{n} a fraction	decimal H_{n}	relative size
1	1	1	
2	3 / 2	1.5	
3	11 / 6	~1.83333	
4	25 / 12	~2.08333	
5	137 / 60	~2.28333	
6	49 / 20	2.45	
7	363 / 140	~2.59286	
8	761 / 280	~2.71786	
9	7 129 / 2 520	~2.82897	
10	7 381 / 2 520	~2.92897	
11	83 711 / 27 720	~3.01988	
12	86 021 / 27 720	~3.10321	
13	1 145 993 / 360 360	~3.18013	
14	1 171 733 / 360 360	~3.25156	
15	1 195 757 / 360 360	~3.31823	
16	2 436 559 / 720 720	~3.38073	
17	42 142 223 / 12 252 240	~3.43955	
18	14 274 301 / 4 084 080	~3.49511	
19	275 295 799 / 77 597 520	~3.54774	
20	55 835 135 / 15 519 504	~3.59774	
21	18 858 053 / 5 173 168	~3.64536	
22	19 093 197 / 5 173 168	~3.69081	
23	444 316 699 / 118 982 864	~3.73429	
24	1 347 822 955 / 356 948 592	~3.77596	
25	34 052 522 467 / 8 923 714 800	~3.81596	
26	34 395 742 267 / 8 923 714 800	~3.85442	
27	312 536 252 003 / 80 313 433 200	~3.89146	
28	315 404 588 903 / 80 313 433 200	~3.92717	
29	9 227 046 511 387 / 2 329 089 562 800	~3.96165	
30	9 304 682 830 147 / 2 329 089 562 800	~3.99499	
31	290 774 257 297 357 / 72 201 776 446 800	~4.02725	
32	586 061 125 622 639 / 144 403 552 893 600	~4.05850	
33	53 676 090 078 349 / 13 127 595 717 600	~4.08880	
34	54 062 195 834 749 / 13 127 595 717 600	~4.11821	
35	54 437 269 998 109 / 13 127 595 717 600	~4.14678	
36	54 801 925 434 709 / 13 127 595 717 600	~4.17456	
37	2 040 798 836 801 833 / 485 721 041 551 200	~4.20159	
38	2 053 580 969 474 233 / 485 721 041 551 200	~4.22790	
39	2 066 035 355 155 033 / 485 721 041 551 200	~4.25354	
40	2 078 178 381 193 813 / 485 721 041 551 200	~4.27854	

== Identities involving harmonic numbers ==
By definition, the harmonic numbers satisfy the recurrence relation
$$H_{n + 1} = H_{n} + \frac{1}{n + 1}.$$

The harmonic numbers are connected to the Stirling numbers of the first kind by the relation
$$H_n = \frac{1}{n!}\left[{n+1 \atop 2}\right].$$

The harmonic numbers satisfy the series identities
$$\sum_{k=1}^n H_k = (n+1) H_{n} - n$$
and
$$\sum_{k=1}^n H_k^2 = (n+1)H_{n}^2 - (2 n +1) H_n + 2 n.$$
These two results are closely analogous to the corresponding integral results
$$\int_0^x \log y \  d y = x \log x - x$$
and
$$\int_0^x (\log y)^2\ d y = x (\log x)^2 - 2 x \log x + 2 x.$$

=== Identities involving π ===
There are several infinite summations involving harmonic numbers and powers of π:
$$\begin{align}
\sum_{n=1}^\infty \frac{H_n}{n\cdot 2^n} &= \frac{\pi^2}{12} \\
\sum_{n=1}^\infty \frac{H_n^2}{n^2} &= \frac{17}{360}\pi^4 \\
\sum_{n=1}^\infty \frac{H_n^2}{(n+1)^2} &= \frac{11}{360}\pi^4 \\
\sum_{n=1}^\infty \frac{H_n}{n^3} &= \frac{\pi^4}{72}
\end{align}$$

== Calculation ==
An integral representation given by Euler is
$$H_n = \int_0^1 \frac{1 - x^n}{1 - x}\,dx.$$

The equality above is straightforward by the simple algebraic identity
$$\frac{1-x^n}{1-x}=1+x+\cdots +x^{n-1}.$$

Using the substitution x = 1 − u, another expression for H_{n} is
$$\begin{align}
H_n &= \int_0^1 \frac{1 - x^n}{1 - x}\,dx = \int_0^1\frac{1-(1-u)^n}{u}\,du \\[6pt]
&= \int_0^1\left[\sum_{k=1}^n \binom nk (-u)^{k-1}\right]\,du
= \sum_{k=1}^n \binom nk \int_0^1 (-u)^{k-1}\,du \\[6pt]
&= \sum_{k=1}^n \binom nk \frac{(-1)^{k-1}}{k}.
\end{align}$$

Graph demonstrating a connection between harmonic numbers and the natural logarithm. The harmonic number H_{n} can be interpreted as a Riemann sum of the integral: $\int_1^{n+1} \frac{dx}{x} = \ln(n+1).$

The nth harmonic number is about as large as the natural logarithm of n. The reason is that the sum is approximated by the integral
$$\int_1^n \frac{1}{x}\, dx,$$
whose value is ln n.

The values of the sequence H_{n} − ln n decrease monotonically towards the limit
$$\lim_{n \to \infty} \left(H_n - \ln n\right) = \gamma,$$
where γ ≈ 0.5772156649 is the Euler–Mascheroni constant. The corresponding asymptotic expansion is
$$\begin{align}
H_n &\sim \ln{n}+\gamma+\frac{1}{2n}-\sum_{k=1}^\infty \frac{B_{2k}}{2k n^{2k}}\\
&=\ln{n}+\gamma+\frac{1}{2n}-\frac{1}{12n^2}+\frac{1}{120n^4}-\cdots,
\end{align}$$
where B_{k} are the Bernoulli numbers.

== Generating functions ==
A generating function for the harmonic numbers is
$$\sum_{n=1}^\infty z^n H_n = \frac {-\ln(1-z)}{1-z},$$
where ln(z) is the natural logarithm. An exponential generating function is
$$\sum_{n=1}^\infty \frac {z^n}{n!} H_n = e^z \sum_{k=1}^\infty \frac{(-1)^{k-1}}{k} \frac {z^k}{k!} = e^z \operatorname{Ein}(z)$$
where Ein(z) is the entire exponential integral. The exponential integral may also be expressed as
$$\operatorname{Ein}(z) = \mathrm{E}_1(z) + \gamma + \ln z = \Gamma (0,z) + \gamma + \ln z$$
where Γ(0, z) is the incomplete gamma function.

== Arithmetic properties ==
The harmonic numbers have several interesting arithmetic properties. It is well-known that $H_n$ is an integer if and only if $n=1$, a result often attributed to Theisinger. Indeed, using 2-adic valuation, it is not difficult to prove that for $n \ge 2$ the numerator of $H_n$ is an odd number while the denominator of $H_n$ is an even number. More precisely,
$$H_n=\frac{1}{2^{\lfloor\log_2(n)\rfloor}}\frac{a_n}{b_n}$$
with some odd integers $a_n$ and $b_n$.

As a consequence of Wolstenholme's theorem, for any prime number $p \ge 5$ the numerator of $H_{p-1}$ is divisible by $p^2$. Furthermore, Eisenstein proved that for all odd prime number $p$ it holds
$$H_{(p-1)/2} \equiv -2q_p(2) \pmod p$$
where $q_p(2) = (2^{p-1} -1)/p$ is a Fermat quotient, with the consequence that $p$ divides the numerator of $H_{(p-1)/2}$ if and only if $p$ is a Wieferich prime.

In 1991, Eswarathasan and Levine defined $J_p$ as the set of all positive integers $n$ such that the numerator of $H_n$ is divisible by a prime number $p.$ They proved that
$$\{p-1,p^2-p,p^2-1\}\subseteq J_p$$
for all prime numbers $p \ge 5,$ and they defined harmonic primes to be the primes $p$ such that $J_p$ has exactly 3 elements.

Eswarathasan and Levine also conjectured that $J_p$ is a finite set for all primes $p,$ and that there are infinitely many harmonic primes. Boyd verified that $J_p$ is finite for all prime numbers up to $p = 547$ except 83, 127, and 397; and he gave a heuristic suggesting that the density of the harmonic primes in the set of all primes should be $1/e$. Sanna showed that $J_p$ has zero asymptotic density, while Bing-Ling Wu and Yong-Gao Chen proved that the number of elements of $J_p$ not exceeding $x$ is at most $3x^{\frac{2}{3}+\frac1{25 \log p}}$, for all $x \geq 1$.

== Applications ==
Block-stacking problem: the maximum horizontal overhang of a stack of N blocks is H_{n−1} / 2 times the length of a block

The harmonic numbers appear in several calculation formulas, such as the digamma function
$$\psi(n) = H_{n-1} - \gamma.$$
This relation is also frequently used to define the extension of the harmonic numbers to non-integer n. The harmonic numbers are also frequently used to define γ using the limit introduced earlier:
$$\gamma = \lim_{n \rightarrow \infty}{\left(H_n - \ln(n)\right)},$$
although
$$\gamma = \lim_{n \to \infty}{\left(H_n - \ln\left(n+\frac{1}{2}\right)\right)}$$
converges more quickly.

In 2002, Jeffrey Lagarias proved that the Riemann hypothesis is equivalent to the statement that
$$\sigma(n) \le H_n + (\log H_n)e^{H_n},$$
is true for every integer n ≥ 1 with strict inequality if n > 1; here σ(n) denotes the sum of the divisors of n.

The eigenvalues of the nonlocal problem on $L^2([-1,1])$
$$\lambda \varphi(x) = \int_{-1}^{1} \frac{\varphi(x)-\varphi(y)}{|x-y|} \, dy$$
are given by $\lambda = 2H_n$, where by convention $H_0 = 0$, and the corresponding eigenfunctions are given by the Legendre polynomials $\varphi(x) = P_n(x)$.

== Generalizations ==
=== Generalized harmonic numbers ===
The nth generalized harmonic number of order m is given by
$$H_{n,m}=\sum_{k=1}^n \frac{1}{k^m}.$$

(In some sources, this may also be denoted by $H_n^{(m)}$ or $H_m(n).$)

The special case m = 0 gives $H_{n,0}= n.$ The special case m = 1 reduces to the usual harmonic number:
$$H_{n, 1} = H_n = \sum_{k=1}^n \frac{1}{k}.$$

The limit of $H_{n, m}$ as n → ∞ is finite if m > 1, with the generalized harmonic number bounded by and converging to the Riemann zeta function
$$\lim_{n\rightarrow \infty} H_{n,m} = \zeta(m).$$

The smallest natural number k such that k^{n} does not divide the denominator of generalized harmonic number H(k, n) nor the denominator of alternating generalized harmonic number H′(k, n) is, for n=1, 2, ... :

77, 20, 94556602, 42, 444, 20, 104, 42, 76, 20, 77, 110, 3504, 20, 903, 42, 1107, 20, 104, 42, 77, 20, 2948, 110, 136, 20, 76, 42, 903, 20, 77, 42, 268, 20, 7004, 110, 1752, 20, 19203, 42, 77, 20, 104, 42, 76, 20, 370, 110, 1107, 20, ... (sequence A128670 in the OEIS)

The related sum $\sum_{k=1}^n k^m$ occurs in the study of Bernoulli numbers; the harmonic numbers also appear in the study of Stirling numbers.

Some integrals of generalized harmonic numbers are
$$\int_0^a H_{x,2} \, dx = a \frac {\pi^2}{6}-H_{a}$$
and
$$\int_0^a H_{x,3} \, dx = a A - \frac {1}{2} H_{a,2},$$
where A is Apéry's constant ζ(3), and
$$\sum_{k=1}^n H_{k,m}=(n+1)H_{n,m}- H_{n,m-1} \text{ for } m \geq 0 .$$

Every generalized harmonic number of order m can be written as a function of harmonic numbers of order $m-1$ using
$$H_{n,m} = \sum_{k=1}^{n-1} \frac {H_{k,m-1}}{k(k+1)} + \frac {H_{n,m-1}}{n}$$
for example: $H_{4,3} = \frac {H_{1,2}}{1 \cdot 2} + \frac {H_{2,2}}{2 \cdot 3} + \frac {H_{3,2}}{3 \cdot 4} + \frac {H_{4,2}}{4}$

A generating function for the generalized harmonic numbers is
$$\sum_{n=1}^\infty z^n H_{n,m} = \frac {\operatorname{Li}_m(z)}{1-z},$$
where $\operatorname{Li}_m(z)$ is the polylogarithm, and |z| < 1. The generating function given above for m = 1 is a special case of this formula.

A fractional argument for generalized harmonic numbers can be introduced as follows:

For every $p,q>0$ integer, and $m>1$ integer or not, we have from polygamma functions:
$$H_{q/p,m}=\zeta(m)-p^m\sum_{k=1}^\infty \frac{1}{(q+pk)^m}$$
where $\zeta(m)$ is the Riemann zeta function. The relevant recurrence relation is
$$H_{a,m}=H_{a-1,m}+\frac{1}{a^m}.$$
Some special values are
$$\begin{align}
H_{\frac{1}{4},2} &= 16-\tfrac{5}{6}\pi^2 -8G\\
H_{\frac{1}{2},2} &= 4-\frac{\pi^2}{3} \\
H_{\frac{3}{4},2} &= \frac{16}{9}-\frac{5}{6}\pi^2 + 8G \\
H_{\frac{1}{4},3} &= 64-\pi^3-27\zeta(3) \\
H_{\frac{1}{2},3} & =8-6\zeta(3) \\
H_{\frac{3}{4},3} &= \left(\frac{4}{3}\right)^3+\pi^3 -27\zeta(3)
\end{align}$$
where G is Catalan's constant. In the special case that $p = 1$, we get
$$H_{n,m}=\zeta(m, 1) - \zeta(m, n+1),$$

where $\zeta(m, n)$ is the Hurwitz zeta function. This relationship is used to calculate harmonic numbers numerically.

=== Multiplication formulas ===
The multiplication theorem applies to harmonic numbers. Using polygamma functions, we obtain
$$\begin{align}
H_{2x} & =\frac{1}{2}\left(H_x+H_{x-\frac{1}{2}}\right)+\ln 2 \\
H_{3x} &= \frac{1}{3}\left(H_x+H_{x-\frac{1}{3}}+H_{x-\frac{2}{3}}\right)+\ln 3,
\end{align}$$
or, more generally,
$$H_{nx}=\frac{1}{n}\left(H_x+H_{x-\frac{1}{n}}+H_{x-\frac{2}{n}}+\cdots +H_{x-\frac{n-1}{n}} \right) + \ln n.$$

For generalized harmonic numbers, we have
$$\begin{align}
H_{2x,2} &= \frac{1}{2}\left(\zeta(2)+\frac{1}{2}\left(H_{x,2}+H_{x-\frac{1}{2},2}\right)\right) \\
H_{3x,2} &= \frac{1}{9}\left(6\zeta(2)+H_{x,2}+H_{x-\frac{1}{3},2}+H_{x-\frac{2}{3},2}\right),
\end{align}$$
where $\zeta(n)$ is the Riemann zeta function.

=== Hyperharmonic numbers ===
The next generalization was discussed by J. H. Conway and R. K. Guy in their 1995 book The Book of Numbers. Let
$$H_n^{(0)} = \frac1n.$$
Then the nth hyperharmonic number of order r (r>0) is defined recursively as
$$H_n^{(r)} = \sum_{k=1}^n H_k^{(r-1)}.$$
In particular, $H_n^{(1)}$ is the ordinary harmonic number $H_n$.

=== Roman harmonic numbers ===
The Roman harmonic numbers, named after Steven Roman, were introduced by Daniel Loeb and Gian-Carlo Rota in the context of a generalization of umbral calculus with logarithms. One possible definition for $n,k \geq 0$, is
$$c_n^{(0)} = 1,$$
and
$$c_n^{(k+1)} = \sum_{i=1}^n\frac{c_i^{(k)}}{i}.$$
It follows that $c_n^{(1)} = H_n$. If $n \neq 0$, they satisfy
$$c_n^{(k+1)} - \frac{c_n^{(k)}}{n} = c_{n-1}^{(k+1)}.$$
Closed form formulas are
$$c_n^{(k)} = n! (-1)^k s(-n,k),$$
where $s(-n,k)$ is Stirling numbers of the first kind generalized to negative first argument, and
$$c_n^{(k)} = \sum_{j=1}^n \binom{n}{j} \frac{(-1)^{j-1}}{j^k},$$
which was found by Donald Knuth.

In fact, these numbers were defined in a more general manner using Roman numbers and Roman factorials, that include negative values for $n$. This generalization was useful in their study to define harmonic logarithms.

== Harmonic numbers for real and complex values ==
The formulae given above,
$$H_x = \int_0^1 \frac{1-t^x}{1-t} \, dt= \sum_{k=1}^\infty {x \choose k} \frac{(-1)^{k-1}}{k}$$
are an integral and a series representation for a function that interpolates the harmonic numbers and, via analytic continuation, extends the definition to the complex plane other than the negative integers x. The interpolating function is in fact closely related to the digamma function
$$H_x = \psi(x+1)+\gamma,$$
where ψ(x) is the digamma function, and γ is the Euler–Mascheroni constant. The integration process may be repeated to obtain
$$H_{x,2}= \sum_{k=1}^\infty \frac {(-1)^{k-1}}{k} {x \choose k} H_k.$$

The Taylor series for the harmonic numbers is
$$H_x=\sum_{k=2}^\infty (-1)^{k}\zeta (k)\;x^{k-1}\quad\text{ for } |x| < 1$$
which comes from the Taylor series for the digamma function ($\zeta$ is the Riemann zeta function).

=== Alternative, asymptotic formulation ===
There is an asymptotic formulation that gives the same result as the analytic continuation of the integral just described. When seeking to approximate H_{x} for a complex number x, it is effective to first compute H_{m} for some large integer m. Use that as an approximation for the value of H_{m+x}. Then use the recursion relation H_{n} = H_{n−1} + 1/n backwards m times, to unwind it to an approximation for H_{x}. Furthermore, this approximation is exact in the limit as m goes to infinity.

Specifically, for a fixed integer n, it is the case that
$$\lim_{m \rightarrow \infty} \left[H_{m+n} - H_m\right] = 0.$$

If n is not an integer then it is not possible to say whether this equation is true because we have not yet (in this section) defined harmonic numbers for non-integers. However, we do get a unique extension of the harmonic numbers to the non-integers by insisting that this equation continue to hold when the arbitrary integer n is replaced by an arbitrary complex number x,

$$\lim_{m \rightarrow \infty} \left[H_{m+x} - H_m\right] = 0\,.$$
Swapping the order of the two sides of this equation and then subtracting them from H_{x} gives
$$\begin{align}H_x &= \lim_{m \rightarrow \infty} \left[H_m - (H_{m+x}-H_x)\right] \\[6pt]
&= \lim_{m \rightarrow \infty} \left[\left(\sum_{k=1}^m \frac{1}{k}\right) - \left(\sum_{k=1}^m \frac{1}{x+k}\right) \right] \\[6pt]
&= \lim_{m \rightarrow \infty} \sum_{k=1}^m \left(\frac{1}{k} - \frac{1}{x+k}\right) = x \sum_{k=1}^{\infty} \frac{1}{k(x+k)}\, .
\end{align}$$

This infinite series converges for all complex numbers x except the negative integers, which fail because trying to use the recursion relation H_{n} = H_{n−1} + 1/n backwards through the value n = 0 involves a division by zero. By this construction, the function that defines the harmonic number for complex values is the unique function that simultaneously satisfies (1) H_{0} = 0, (2) H_{x} = H_{x−1} + 1/x for all complex numbers x except the non-positive integers, and (3) lim_{m→+∞} (H_{m+x} − H_{m}) = 0 for all complex values x.

This last formula can be used to show that
$$\int_0^1 H_x \, dx = \gamma,$$
where γ is the Euler–Mascheroni constant or, more generally, for every n we have:
$$\int_0^nH_{x}\,dx = n\gamma + \ln(n!) .$$

=== Special values for fractional arguments ===
There are the following special analytic values for fractional arguments between 0 and 1, given by the integral
$$H_\alpha = \int_0^1\frac{1-x^\alpha}{1-x}\,dx\, .$$

More values may be generated from the recurrence relation
$$H_\alpha = H_{\alpha-1}+\frac{1}{\alpha}\,,$$
or from the reflection relation
$$H_{-\alpha}-H_{\alpha-1} = \pi\cot{(\pi\alpha)}.$$

For example:
$$\begin{align}
H_{\frac{1}{2}} &= 2 - 2\ln 2 \\
H_{\frac{1}{3}} &= 3 - \frac{\pi}{2\sqrt{3}} - \frac{3}{2}\ln 3 \\
H_{\frac{2}{3}} &= \frac{3}{2}+\frac{\pi}{2\sqrt{3}} - \frac{3}{2}\ln 3 \\
H_{\frac{1}{4}} &= 4 - \frac{\pi}{2} - 3\ln 2 \\
H_{\frac{1}{5}} &= 5 - \frac{\pi}{2} \sqrt{1+\frac{2}{\sqrt{5}}} - \frac{5}{4} \ln 5 - \frac{\sqrt{5}}{2} \ln\left(\frac{1+\sqrt{5}}{2}\right) \\
H_{\frac{3}{4}} &= \frac{4}{3} + \frac{\pi}{2} - 3\ln 2 \\
H_{\frac{1}{6}} &= 6 - \frac{\sqrt{3}}{2} \pi - 2\ln 2 - \frac{3}{2} \ln 3 \\
H_{\frac{1}{8}} &= 8 - \frac{1+\sqrt{2}}{2} \pi - 4\ln{2} - \frac{1}{\sqrt{2}} \left(\ln\left(2 + \sqrt{2}\right) - \ln\left(2 - \sqrt{2}\right)\right) \\
H_{\frac{1}{12}} &= 12 - \left(1+\frac{\sqrt{3}}{2}\right)\pi - 3\ln{2} - \frac{3}{2} \ln{3} + \sqrt{3} \ln\left(2-\sqrt{3}\right)
\end{align}$$

Which are computed via Gauss's digamma theorem, which essentially states that for positive integers p and q with p < q
$$H_{\frac{p}{q}} = \frac{q}{p} +2\sum_{k=1}^{\lfloor\frac{q-1}{2}\rfloor} \cos\left(\frac{2 \pi pk}{q}\right)\ln\left({\sin \left(\frac{\pi k}{q}\right)}\right)-\frac{\pi}{2}\cot\left(\frac{\pi p}{q}\right)-\ln\left(2q\right)$$

=== Relation to the Riemann zeta function ===
Some derivatives of fractional harmonic numbers are given by
$$\begin{align}
\frac{d^n H_x}{dx^n} & = (-1)^{n+1}n!\left[\zeta(n+1)-H_{x,n+1}\right] \\[6pt]
\frac{d^n H_{x,2}}{dx^n} & = (-1)^{n+1}(n+1)!\left[\zeta(n+2)-H_{x,n+2}\right] \\[6pt]
\frac{d^n H_{x,3}}{dx^n} & = (-1)^{n+1}\frac{1}{2}(n+2)!\left[\zeta(n+3)-H_{x,n+3}\right].
\end{align}$$

And using Maclaurin series, we have for x < 1 that
$$\begin{align}
H_x & = \sum_{n=1}^\infty (-1)^{n+1}x^n\zeta(n+1) \\[5pt]
H_{x,2} & = \sum_{n=1}^\infty (-1)^{n+1}(n+1)x^n\zeta(n+2) \\[5pt]
H_{x,3} & = \frac{1}{2}\sum_{n=1}^\infty (-1)^{n+1}(n+1)(n+2)x^n\zeta(n+3).
\end{align}$$

For fractional arguments between 0 and 1 and for a > 1,
$$\begin{align}
H_{1/a} & = \frac{1}{a}\left(\zeta(2)-\frac{1}{a}\zeta(3)+\frac{1}{a^2}\zeta(4)-\frac{1}{a^3} \zeta(5) + \cdots\right) \\[6pt]
H_{1/a, \, 2} & = \frac{1}{a}\left(2\zeta(3)-\frac{3}{a}\zeta(4)+\frac{4}{a^2}\zeta(5)-\frac{5}{a^3} \zeta(6) + \cdots\right) \\[6pt]
H_{1/a, \, 3} & = \frac{1}{2a}\left(2\cdot3\zeta(4)-\frac{3\cdot4}{a}\zeta(5)+\frac{4\cdot5}{a^2}\zeta(6)-\frac{5\cdot6}{a^3}\zeta(7)+\cdots\right).
\end{align}$$

== See also ==
- Watterson estimator
- Tajima's D
- Coupon collector's problem
- Jeep problem
- 100 prisoners problem
- Riemann zeta function
- List of sums of reciprocals
- False discovery rate#Benjamini–Yekutieli procedure
- Block-stacking problem
