= Large set (combinatorics) =

Set of integers whose sum of reciprocals diverges

In combinatorial mathematics, a large set of positive integers

$$S = \{s_0,s_1,s_2,s_3,\dots\}$$

is one such that the infinite sum of the reciprocals

$$\frac{1}{s_0}+\frac{1}{s_1}+\frac{1}{s_2}+\frac{1}{s_3}+\cdots$$

diverges. A small set is any subset of the positive integers that is not large; that is, one whose sum of reciprocals converges.

Large sets appear in the Müntz–Szász theorem and in the Erdős conjecture on arithmetic progressions.

== Examples ==
- Every finite subset of the positive integers is small.
- The set $\{1,2,3,4,5,\dots\}$ of all positive integers is a large set; this statement is equivalent to the divergence of the harmonic series. More generally, any arithmetic progression (i.e., a set of all integers of the form an + b with a ≥ 1, b ≥ 1 and n = 0, 1, 2, 3, ...) is a large set.
- The set of square numbers is small (see Basel problem § The Riemann zeta function). So is the set of cube numbers, the set of 4th powers, and so on. More generally, the set of positive integer values of any polynomial of degree 2 or larger forms a small set.
- The set {1, 2, 4, 8, ...} of powers of 2 is a small set, and so is any geometric progression (i.e., a set of numbers of the form of the form ab^{n} with a ≥ 1, b ≥ 2 and n = 0, 1, 2, 3, ...).
- The set of prime numbers is large. The set of twin primes is small (see Brun's constant).
- The set of prime powers which are not prime (i.e., all numbers of the form p^{n} with n ≥ 2 and p prime) is small although the primes are large. This property is frequently used in analytic number theory. More generally, the set of perfect powers is small; even the set of powerful numbers is small.
- The set of numbers whose expansions in a given base exclude a given digit is small. For example, the set
  $$\{1, 2, \dots, 5, 6, 8, 9, \dots, 15, 16, 18, 19, \dots, 65, 66, 68, 69, 80, 81, \dots \}$$
  of integers whose decimal expansion does not include the digit 7 is small. Such series are called Kempner series.
- Any set whose upper asymptotic density is nonzero, is large.
- The set of all primes in an arithmetic progression an + b, where a and b are coprime is large (see Dirichlet's theorem on arithmetic progressions).

== Properties ==
- Every subset of a small set is small.
- The union of finitely many small sets is small, because the sum of two convergent series is a convergent series. (Hence, the small sets form an ideal on the set of positive integers.)
- The complement of every small set is large.
- The Müntz–Szász theorem states that a set $S=\{s_1,s_2,s_3,\dots\}$ is large if and only if the set of polynomials spanned by
  $$\{1,x^{s_1},x^{s_2},x^{s_3},\dots\}$$
  is dense in the uniform norm topology of continuous functions on a closed interval in the positive real numbers. This is a generalization of the Stone–Weierstrass theorem.

== Open problems involving large sets ==
Paul Erdős conjectured that all large sets contain arbitrarily long arithmetic progressions. He offered a prize of $3000 for a proof, more than for any of his other conjectures, and joked that this prize offer violated the minimum wage law. The question is still open.

It is not known how to identify whether a given set is large or small in general. As a result, there are many sets which are not known to be either large or small.

== See also ==
- List of sums of reciprocals
