= Müntz–Szász theorem =

Basic result of approximation theory

The Müntz–Szász theorem is a basic result of approximation theory, proved by Herman Müntz in 1914 and Otto Szász in 1916. Roughly speaking, the theorem shows to what extent the Weierstrass theorem on polynomial approximation can be extended by restricting certain coefficients in the polynomials to be zero. The form of the result had been conjectured by Sergei Bernstein before it was proved.

The theorem, in a special case, states that a necessary and sufficient condition for the monomials

$$x^n,\quad n\in S\subset\mathbb N$$

to span a dense subset of the Banach space C[a,b] of all continuous functions with complex number values on the closed interval [a,b] with a > 0, with the uniform norm, is that the sum

$$\sum_{n\in S}\frac{1}{n}\$$

of the reciprocals, taken over S, should diverge, i.e. S is a large set. For an interval [0, b], the constant functions are necessary: assuming therefore that 0 is in S, the condition on the other exponents is as before.

More generally, one can take exponents from any strictly increasing sequence of positive real numbers, and the same result holds. Szász showed that for complex number exponents, the same condition applied to the sequence of real parts.

There are also versions for the L_{p} spaces.

== See also ==
- Erdős conjecture on arithmetic progressions
