= Hyperharmonic number =

In mathematics, the n-th hyperharmonic number of order r, denoted by $H_n^{(r)}$, is recursively defined by the relations:

$$H_n^{(0)} = \frac{1}{n} ,$$

and

$H_n^{(r)} = \sum_{k=1}^n H_k^{(r-1)}\quad(r>0).$

In particular, $H_n=H_n^{(1)}$ is the n-th harmonic number.

The hyperharmonic numbers were discussed by J. H. Conway and R. K. Guy in their 1995 book The Book of Numbers.

== Identities involving hyperharmonic numbers ==
By definition, the hyperharmonic numbers satisfy the recurrence relation

$$H_n^{(r)} = H_{n-1}^{(r)} + H_n^{(r-1)}.$$

In place of the recurrences, there is a more effective formula to calculate these numbers:

$$H_{n}^{(r)}=\binom{n+r-1}{r-1}(H_{n+r-1}-H_{r-1}).$$

The hyperharmonic numbers have a strong relation to combinatorics of permutations. The generalization of the identity

$$H_n = \frac{1}{n!}\left[{n+1 \atop 2}\right].$$

reads as

$$H_n^{(r)} = \frac{1}{n!}\left[{n+r \atop r+1}\right]_r,$$

where $\left[{n \atop r}\right]_r$ is an r-Stirling number of the first kind.

== Asymptotics ==
The above expression with binomial coefficients easily gives that for all fixed order r>=2 we have.

$$H_n^{(r)}\sim\frac{1}{(r-1)!}\left(n^{r-1}\ln(n)\right),$$

that is, the quotient of the left and right hand side tends to 1 as n tends to infinity.

An immediate consequence is that

$$\sum_{n=1}^\infty\frac{H_n^{(r)}}{n^m}<+\infty$$

when m>r.

== Generating function and infinite series ==
The generating function of the hyperharmonic numbers is

$$\sum_{n=0}^\infty H_n^{(r)}z^n=-\frac{\ln(1-z)}{(1-z)^r}.$$

The exponential generating function is much harder to deduce. One has that for all r=1,2,...

$$\sum_{n=0}^\infty H_n^{(r)}\frac{t^n}{n!}=e^t\left(\sum_{n=1}^{r-1}H_n^{(r-n)}\frac{t^n}{n!}+\frac{(r-1)!}{(r!)^2}t^r\, _2 F_2\left(1,1;r+1,r+1;-t\right)\right),$$

where _{2}F_{2} is a hypergeometric function. The r=1 case for the harmonic numbers is a classical result, the general one was proved in 2009 by I. Mező and A. Dil.

The next relation connects the hyperharmonic numbers to the Hurwitz zeta function:

$$\sum_{n=1}^\infty\frac{H_n^{(r)}}{n^m}=\sum_{n=1}^\infty H_n^{(r-1)}\zeta(m,n)\quad(r\ge1,m\ge r+1).$$

== Integer hyperharmonic numbers ==
It is known, that the harmonic numbers are never integers except the case n=1. The same question can be posed with respect to the hyperharmonic numbers: are there integer hyperharmonic numbers? István Mező proved that if r=2 or r=3, these numbers are never integers except the trivial case when n=1. He conjectured that this is always the case, namely, the hyperharmonic numbers of order r are never integers except when n=1. This conjecture was justified for a class of parameters by R. Amrane and H. Belbachir. Especially, these authors proved that $H_n^{(4)}$ is not integer for all r<26 and n=2,3,... Extension to high orders was made by Göral and Sertbaş. These authors have also shown that $H_n^{(r)}$ is never integer when n is even or a prime power, or r is odd.

Another result is the following. Let $S(x)$ be the number of non-integer hyperharmonic numbers such that $(n,x)\in[0,x]\times[0,x]$. Then, assuming the Cramér's conjecture,

$$S(x)=x^2+O(x\log^3x).$$

Note that the number of integer lattice points in $[0,x]\times[0,x]$ is $x^2+O(x^2)$, which shows that most of the hyperharmonic numbers cannot be integers.

The problem was finally settled by D. C. Sertbaş who found that there are infinitely many hyperharmonic integers, albeit they are quite huge. The smallest hyperharmonic number which is an integer found so far is

$$H_{33}^{(64(2^{2659}-1)+32)}.$$
