= Herman Müntz =

German-Jewish mathematician

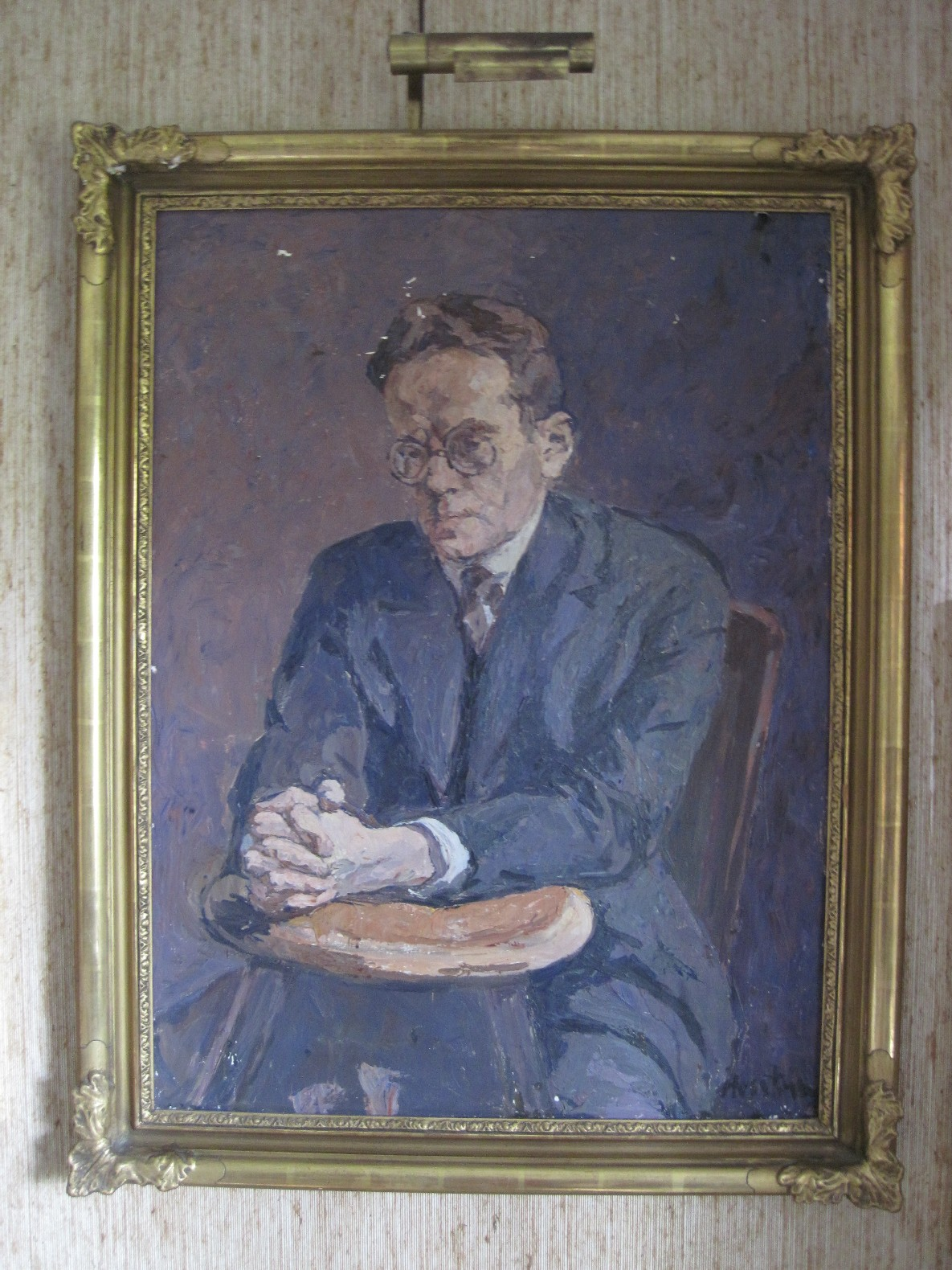

(Chaim) Herman Müntz (28 August 1884, in Łódź – 17 April 1956, in Sweden) was a German mathematician, now remembered for the Müntz approximation theorem.

== Biography ==
He was born in Łódź (then in the Piotrków Governorate of the Russian Empire, now in Poland) in a secular Jewish family, who had adopted a German spelling of the surname Minc. He was educated there and at the Friedrich-Wilhelms-Universität in Berlin, graduating in 1906. He wrote a doctoral dissertation there on partial differential equations and the Plateau problem, in 1910, supervised by H. A. Schwarz.

In 1911 he moved to Munich. In the following years he published on projective geometry, iterative methods, and approximation theory.

In 1914 he took a teaching position in a school near Heppenheim, and a year later another in Hochwaldhausen. He became a German citizen in 1919. At around that time he suffered a breakdown, and moved back to Poland with his wife. He shortly began publishing mathematics again. The couple moved to Göttingen in 1921, and Müntz became involved in editorial, reviewing and translation work, as well as research. At this period, and from 1924 in Berlin, he was unsuccessfully trying to get an academic position, hampered because he had not habilitated. In 1927 he worked closely with Albert Einstein.

In 1929 he took a professorial position at the Leningrad State University, where he was active in teaching, research, administration and as an editor of Lyapunov. Though he left Germany before the Nazis seized power in 1933, some scholars consider him an early Jewish emigrant from Nazi Germany; his career was negatively impacted by anti-semitism and he was not able to return to Germany, unlike early non-Jewish emigrants such as Eberhard Hopf and Wilhelm Maier.

In 1932 he was an official Soviet delegate to the International Congress of Mathematicians, with N. G. Chebotarev, P. S. Alexandrov, and E. Y. Kolman, an ideological Marxist. While in Russia, Müntz was influential in helping several other mathematicians escape from the Nazis. In 1937 Müntz, who remained a German citizen, was expelled from the USSR. He went to Sweden, where he supported himself by teaching. He obtained Swedish citizenship in 1953.

He wrote extensively on Judaism and related topics. In 1907 his book Wir Juden was published in Berlin. He was a correspondent of Martin Buber, and wrote much for Buber's journal Der Jude.

== Selected publications ==
- Müntz, Ch. H., Über den Approximationssatz von Weierstrass, (1914) in H. A. Schwarz's Festschrift, pp. 303–312.
- Müntz, Ch. H., "Zum Randwertproblem der partiellen Differentialgleichung der minimal Flächen (PhD thesis, Berlin 1910) http://gdz.sub.uni-goettingen.de/dms/load/img/?PID=PPN271032634%7CLOG_0002
