= List of sums of reciprocals =

In mathematics and number theory, the sum of reciprocals (or sum of inverses) is defined as the sum of reciprocals of some series of positive integers (counting numbers). It is a sum of unit fractions. If infinitely many numbers have their reciprocals summed, generally the terms are given as a sequence whose nth term is defined as the sum of the first n reciprocals.

For sums of reciprocals over a series of finitely many numbers, key questions include whether there is a simple expression for the value of the sum, whether the sum must be less than a certain value, and whether the sum is ever an integer.

When the sum of reciprocals is over an infinite series, questions include: First, does the sequence of sums diverge—that is, does it eventually exceed any given number—or does it converge, meaning there is some number that it gets arbitrarily close to without ever exceeding it? (A set of positive integers is said to be large if the sum of its reciprocals diverges, and small if it converges.) Second, if it converges, what is a simple expression for the value it converges to? Is that value rational or irrational, and is that value algebraic or transcendental?

== Finitely many terms ==
- The harmonic mean of a set of positive integers is the number of numbers times the reciprocal of the sum of their reciprocals.
- The optic equation requires the sum of the reciprocals of two positive integers a and b to equal the reciprocal of a third positive integer c. All solutions are given by a = mn + m^{2}, b = mn + n^{2}, c = mn. This equation appears in various contexts in elementary geometry.
- The Fermat–Catalan conjecture concerns a certain Diophantine equation, equating the sum of two terms, each a positive integer raised to a positive integer power, to a third term that is also a positive integer raised to a positive integer power (with the base integers having no prime factor in common). The conjecture asks whether the equation has an infinitude of solutions in which the sum of the reciprocals of the three exponents in the equation must be less than 1. The purpose of this restriction is to preclude the known infinitude of solutions in which two exponents are 2 and the other exponent is any even number.
- The n-th harmonic number, which is the sum of the reciprocals of the first n positive integers, is never an integer except for the case n = 1.
- Moreover, József Kürschák proved in 1918 that the sum of the reciprocals of consecutive natural numbers (whether starting from 1 or not) is never an integer.
- The sum of the reciprocals of the first n primes is not an integer for any n.
- There are 14 distinct combinations of four integers such that the sum of their reciprocals is 1, of which six use four distinct integers and eight repeat at least one integer.
- An Egyptian fraction is the sum of a finite number of reciprocals of positive integers. According to the proof of the Erdős–Graham problem, if the set of integers greater than one is partitioned into finitely many subsets, then one of the subsets can be used to form an Egyptian fraction representation of 1.
- The Erdős–Straus conjecture states that for all integers n ≥ 2, the rational number 4/n can be expressed as the sum of three reciprocals of positive integers.
- The Fermat quotient with base 2, which is $\frac{2^{p-1}-1}{p}$ for odd prime p, when expressed in mod p and multiplied by −2, equals the sum of the reciprocals mod p of the numbers lying in the first half of the range {1, p − 1}.
- In any triangle, the sum of the reciprocals of the altitudes equals the reciprocal of the radius of the incircle (regardless of whether or not they are integers).
- In a right triangle, the sum of the reciprocals of the squares of the altitudes from the legs (equivalently, of the squares of the legs themselves) equals the reciprocal of the square of the altitude from the hypotenuse (the inverse Pythagorean theorem). This holds whether or not the numbers are integers; there is a formula (see here) that generates all integer cases.
- A triangle not necessarily in the Euclidean plane can be specified as having angles $\frac{\pi}{p},$ $\frac{\pi}{q},$ and $\frac{\pi}{r}.$ Then the triangle is in Euclidean space if the sum of the reciprocals of p, q, and r equals 1, spherical space if that sum is greater than 1, and hyperbolic space if the sum is less than 1.
- A harmonic divisor number is a positive integer whose divisors have a harmonic mean that is an integer. The first five of these are 1, 6, 28, 140, and 270. It is not known whether any harmonic divisor numbers (besides 1) are odd, but there are no odd ones less than 10^{24}.
- The sum of the reciprocals of the divisors of a perfect number is 2.
- When eight points are distributed on the surface of a sphere with the aim of maximizing the distance between them in some sense, the resulting shape corresponds to a square antiprism. Specific methods of distributing the points include, for example, minimizing the sum of all reciprocals of squares of distances between points.

== Infinitely many terms ==
=== Convergent series ===
- A sum-free sequence of increasing positive integers is one for which no number is the sum of any subset of the previous ones. The sum of the reciprocals of the numbers in any sum-free sequence is less than 2.8570.
- The sum of the reciprocals of the heptagonal numbers converges to a known value that is not only irrational but also transcendental, and for which there exists a complicated formula.
- The sum of the reciprocals of the twin primes, of which there may be finitely many or infinitely many, is known to be finite and is called Brun's constant, approximately 1.90216. (By convention, the reciprocal of $5$ appears twice in the sum.)
- The sum of the reciprocals of the Proth primes, of which there may be finitely many or infinitely many, is known to be finite, approximately 0.747392479.
- The prime quadruplets are pairs of twin primes with only one odd number between them. The sum of the reciprocals of the numbers in prime quadruplets is approximately 0.8706.
- The sum of the reciprocals of the perfect powers (including duplicates) is 1.
- The sum of the reciprocals of the perfect powers (excluding duplicates) is approximately 0.8745.
- The sum of the reciprocals of the powers $\ n^n\$ is approximately equal to 1.2913. The sum is exactly equal to a definite integral:
  $$\ \sum_{n=1}^\infty \frac{1}{\ n^n } = \int_0^1 \frac{\ dx\ }{\ x^x}\$$

This identity was discovered by Johann Bernoulli in 1697, and is now known as one of the two Sophomore's dream identities.

- The Goldbach–Euler theorem states that the sum of the reciprocals of the numbers that are 1 less than a perfect power (excluding duplicates) is 1.
- The sum of the reciprocals of all the non-zero triangular numbers is 2.
- The reciprocal Fibonacci constant is the sum of the reciprocals of the Fibonacci numbers, which is known to be finite and irrational and approximately equal to 3.3599. For other finite sums of subsets of the reciprocals of Fibonacci numbers, see here.
- An exponential factorial is an operation recursively defined as $\ a_0 = 1, ~ a_n = n^{a_{n - 1}} ~.$ For example, $\ a_4 = 4^{3^{2^1}}\$ where the exponents are evaluated from the top down. The sum of the reciprocals of the exponential factorials from 1 onward is approximately 1.6111 and is transcendental.
- A "powerful number" is a positive integer for which every prime appearing in its prime factorization appears there at least twice. The sum of the reciprocals of the powerful numbers is close to 1.9436.
- The reciprocals of the factorials sum to the transcendental number e (one of two constants called "Euler's number").
- The sum of the reciprocals of the square numbers (the Basel problem) is the transcendental number π^{2} /6, or ζ(2) where ζ is the Riemann zeta function.
- The sum of the reciprocals of the cubes of positive integers is called Apéry's constant ζ(3) , and equals approximately 1.2021. This number is irrational, but it is not known whether or not it is transcendental.
- The reciprocals of the non-negative integer powers of 2 sum to 2. This is a particular case of the sum of the reciprocals of any geometric series where the first term and the common ratio are positive integers. If the first term is a and the common ratio is r then the sum is r/( a (r − 1)).
- The Kempner series is the sum of the reciprocals of all positive integers not containing the digit "9" in base 10. Unlike the harmonic series, which does not exclude those numbers, this series converges, specifically to approximately 22.9207.
- A palindromic number is one that remains the same when its digits are reversed. The sum of the reciprocals of the palindromic numbers converges to approximately 3.3703.
- A pentatope number is a number in the fifth cell of any row of Pascal's triangle starting with the five-term row 1 4 6 4 1. The sum of the reciprocals of the pentatope numbers is 4/ 3 .
- Sylvester's sequence is an integer sequence in which each member of the sequence is the product of the previous members, plus one. The first few terms of the sequence are 2, 3, 7, 43, 1807. The sum of the reciprocals of the numbers in Sylvester's sequence is 1.
- The Riemann zeta function ζ(s) is a function of a complex variable s that analytically continues the sum of the infinite series
  $$\ \sum_{n=1}^\infty \frac{1}{\ n^s\ } ~$$
  to an analytic function on the entire complex plane except for s = 1, where ζ(s) has a pole. This series converges if and only if the real part of s is greater than 1.
- The sum of the reciprocals of all the Mersenne numbers is the Erdős–Borwein constant.
- The sum of the reciprocals of all the Fermat numbers (numbers of the form $\ 2^{(2^n)} + 1\$) (sequence A051158 in the OEIS) is irrational.
- The sum of the reciprocals of the pronic numbers (products of two consecutive integers) (excluding 0) is 1 (see Telescoping series).
- The difference between $H_{k(n+1)}$ and $H_{k}$ approaches the natural logarithm of $n+1$ as $k$ increases.

=== Divergent series ===
- The n-th partial sum of the harmonic series, which is the sum of the reciprocals of the first n positive integers, diverges as n goes to infinity, albeit extremely slowly: The sum of the first 10^{43} terms is less than 100. The difference between the cumulative sum and the natural logarithm of n converges to the Euler–Mascheroni constant, commonly denoted as $\gamma,$ which is approximately 0.5772.
- The sum of the reciprocals of the primes diverges.
- Given coprime positive integers a and b, the sum of the reciprocal of the primes of the form an + b diverges. This result is used to prove the Dirichlet's theorem, which states that there are infinitely many primes $p$ satisfying $p\equiv a\text{ }(\mathrm{mod}\text{ }b)$.
- The sum of the reciprocals of the primes of the form 4n + 1 is divergent. By Fermat's theorem on sums of two squares, it follows that the sum of reciprocals of numbers of the form $a^2 + b^2,$ where a and b are non-negative integers, not both equal to 0, diverges, with or without repetition.
- If a(k) is any ascending series of positive integers with the property that there exists N such that a(k + 1) − a(k) < N for all k, then the sum of the reciprocals 1/ a(k) diverges.
- The Erdős conjecture on arithmetic progressions states that if the sum of the reciprocals of the members of a set A of positive integers diverges, then A contains arithmetic progressions of any length, however great. As of 2024 the conjecture remains unproven.

== Inverse powers ==
Sums of inverses can be extended to sum of inverse powers:

- Basel problem, the sum of inverse squares
- Apéry's constant, the sum of inverse cubes

== See also ==
- Large set
- Sum of squares
- Sums of powers
