= Divergence of the sum of the reciprocals of the primes =

Theorem in number theory

The sum of the reciprocal of the primes increasing without bound. The x axis is in log scale, showing that the divergence is very slow. The blue function is a lower bound that also diverges.

The sum of the reciprocals of all prime numbers diverges; that is:

$$\sum_{p\text{ prime}}\frac1p = \frac12 + \frac13 + \frac15 + \frac17 + \frac1{11} + \frac1{13} + \frac1{17} + \cdots = \infty$$

This was proved by Leonhard Euler in 1737, and strengthens Euclid's 3rd-century-BC result that there are infinitely many prime numbers and Nicole Oresme's 14th-century proof of the divergence of the sum of the reciprocals of the integers (harmonic series).

There are a variety of proofs of Euler's result, including a lower bound for the partial sums stating that
$$\sum_{\scriptstyle p\text{ prime}\atop \scriptstyle p\le n}\frac1p \ge \log \log (n+1) - \log\frac{\pi^2}6$$
for all natural numbers n. The double natural logarithm (log log) indicates that the divergence might be very slow, which is indeed the case. For instance, the sum of the reciprocals of all prime numbers up to a certain integer does not exceed 3 for the first time until 5195977 and does not exceed 4 for the first time until approximately 1.8 quintillion.

== The harmonic series ==
First, we will describe how Euler originally discovered the result. He was considering the harmonic series
$$\sum_{n=1}^\infty \frac{1}{n} = 1 + \frac{1}{2} + \frac{1}{3} + \frac{1}{4} + \cdots = \infty$$

He had already used the following "product formula" to show the existence of infinitely many primes.

$$\sum_{n=1}^\infty \frac{1}{n} = \prod_{p} \left( 1+\frac{1}{p}+\frac{1}{p^2}+\cdots \right) = \prod_{p} \frac{1}{1-p^{-1}}$$

Here the product is taken over the set of all primes, using prime factorization.

Such infinite products are today called Euler products. The product above is a reflection of the fundamental theorem of arithmetic. Euler noted that if there were only a finite number of primes, then the product on the right would clearly converge, contradicting the divergence of the harmonic series.

== Proofs ==
=== Euler's proof ===
Euler's proof works by first taking the natural logarithm of each side, then using the Taylor series expansion for log x as well as the sum of a converging series:

$$\begin{align}
\log \left( \sum_{n=1}^\infty \frac{1}{n}\right) & {} = \log\left( \prod_p \frac{1}{1-p^{-1}}\right)
= -\sum_p \log \left( 1-\frac{1}{p}\right) \\[5pt]
& = \sum_p \left( \frac{1}{p} + \frac{1}{2p^2} + \frac{1}{3p^3} + \cdots \right) \\[5pt]
& =  \sum_{p}\frac{1}{p} + \frac{1}{2}\sum_p \frac{1}{p^2} + \frac{1}{3}\sum_p \frac{1}{p^3}  + \frac{1}{4}\sum_p \frac{1}{p^4}+ \cdots  \\[5pt]
& =   A  + \frac{1}{2} B+ \frac{1}{3} C+ \frac{1}{4} D  + \cdots  \\[5pt]
& = A  + K
\end{align}$$

for a fixed constant K < 1. This holds by the p-series test and the properties of the Riemann zeta function.

Then, by using the following relation:

$$\sum_{n=1}^\infty\frac{1}{n} = \log\infty,$$

of which, as shown in a later 1748 work, the right hand side can be obtained by setting x = 1 in the Taylor series expansion

$$\log\left(\frac1{1-x}\right)=\sum_{n=1}^\infty\frac{x^{n}}n.$$

Thus,
$$A = \frac{1}{2} + \frac{1}{3} + \frac{1}{5} + \frac{1}{7} + \frac{1}{11} + \cdots = \log \log \infty.$$

It is almost certain (H. M. Edwards was less sanguine and suggested "[i]t is not clear exactly what Euler understood this equation to mean") that Euler meant that the sum of the reciprocals of the primes less than n is asymptotic to log log n as n approaches infinity. It turns out this is indeed the case, and a more precise version of this fact was rigorously proved by Franz Mertens in 1874. Thus Euler obtained a correct result by questionable means.

=== Erdős's proof by upper and lower estimates ===
The following proof by contradiction comes from Paul Erdős.

Let p_{i} denote the ith prime number. Assume that the sum of the reciprocals of the primes converges.

Then there exists a smallest positive integer k such that

$$\sum_{i=k+1}^\infty \frac 1 {p_i} < \frac12 \qquad(1)$$

For a positive integer x, let M_{x} denote the set of those n in {1, 2, ..., x} which are not divisible by any prime greater than p_{k} (or equivalently all n ≤ x which are a product of powers of primes p_{i} ≤ p_{k}). We will now derive an upper and a lower estimate for |M_{x}|, the number of elements in M_{x}. For large x, these bounds will turn out to be contradictory.

Upper estimate
Every n in M_{x} can be written as n = m^{2}r with positive integers m and r, where r is square-free. Since only the k primes p_{1}, ..., p_{k} can show up (with exponent 1) in the prime factorization of r, there are at most 2^{k} different possibilities for r. Furthermore, there are at most √x possible values for m. This gives us the upper estimate
$$|M_x| \le 2^k\sqrt{x} \qquad(2)$$
Lower estimate
The remaining x − |M_{x}| numbers in the set difference {1, 2, ..., x} \ M_{x} are all divisible by a prime greater than p_{k}. Let N_{i,x} denote the set of those n in {1, 2, ..., x} which are divisible by the ith prime p_{i}. Then
$$\{1,2,\ldots,x\}\setminus M_x = \bigcup_{i=k+1}^\infty N_{i,x}$$
Since the number of integers in N_{i,x} is at most x/p_{i} (actually zero for p_{i} > x), we get
$$x-|M_x| \le \sum_{i=k+1}^\infty |N_{i,x}|< \sum_{i=k+1}^\infty \frac x {p_i}$$
Using (1), this implies
$$\frac x 2 < |M_x| \qquad(3)$$

This produces a contradiction: when x ≥ 2^{2k + 2}, the estimates (2) and (3) cannot both hold, because x/2 ≥ 2^{k}√x.

=== Proof that the series exhibits log-log growth ===
Here is another proof that actually gives a lower estimate for the partial sums; in particular, it shows that these sums grow at least as fast as log log n. The proof is due to Ivan Niven, adapted from the product expansion idea of Euler. In the following, a sum or product taken over p always represents a sum or product taken over a specified set of primes.

The proof rests upon the following four inequalities:

- Every positive integer i can be uniquely expressed as the product of a square-free integer and a square as a consequence of the fundamental theorem of arithmetic. To see this, start with
  $$i = q_1^{2{\alpha}_1+{\beta}_1} \cdot q_2^{2{\alpha}_2+{\beta}_2} \cdots q_r^{2{\alpha}_r+{\beta}_r},$$
  where the βs are 0 (the corresponding power of prime q is even) or 1 (the corresponding power of prime q is odd). Factor out one copy of all the primes whose β is 1, leaving a product of primes to even powers, itself a square. Relabeling:
  $$i = (p_1 p_2 \cdots p_s) \cdot b^2,$$
  where the first factor, a product of primes to the first power, is square free. Inverting all the is gives the inequality
  $$\sum_{i=1}^n \frac 1 i \le \left(\prod_{p \le n} \left(1 + \frac 1 p \right)\right) \cdot \left(\sum_{k=1}^n \frac 1 {k^2}\right) = A \cdot B.$$

To see this, note that
$$\frac 1 i = \frac 1 {p_1 p_2 \cdots p_s} \cdot \frac 1 {b^2},$$
and
$$\begin{align}
\left(1 + \frac{1}{p_1}\right)\left(1 + \frac{1}{p_2}\right) \ldots \left(1 + \frac{1}{p_s}\right) &= \left(\frac{1}{p_1}\right)\left(\frac{1}{p_2}\right)\cdots\left(\frac{1}{p_s}\right) + \ldots\\
&= \frac 1 {p_1 p_2 \cdots p_s} + \ldots.
\end{align}$$
That is, $1/(p_1p_2 \cdots p_s)$ is one of the summands in the expanded product A. And since $1 / b^2$ is one of the summands of B, every summand $1/i$ is represented in one of the terms of AB when multiplied out. The inequality follows.

- The upper estimate for the natural logarithm
  $$\begin{align}
\log(n+1) &= \int_1^{n+1} \frac{dx}x \\
&= \sum_{i=1}^n\underbrace{\int_i^{i+1}\frac{dx}x}_{{} \,<\, \frac1i} \\
&< \sum_{i=1}^n \frac 1 i
\end{align}$$
- The lower estimate 1 + x < exp(x) for the exponential function, which holds for all x > 0.
- Let n ≥ 2. The upper bound (using a telescoping sum) for the partial sums (convergence is all we really need)
  $$\begin{align}
\sum_{k=1}^n \frac 1 {k^2}
&< 1 + \sum_{k=2}^n \underbrace{\left(\frac1{k - \frac{1}{2}} - \frac1{k + \frac{1}{2}}\right)}_{=\, \frac{1}{k^2 - \frac14} \,>\, \frac{1}{k^2}} \\
&= 1 + \frac23 - \frac1{n + \frac{1}{2}} < \frac53
\end{align}$$

Combining all these inequalities, we see that
$$\begin{align}
\log(n+1) & < \sum_{i=1}^n\frac{1}{i} \\
& \le \prod_{p \le n} \left(1 + \frac{1}{p}\right) \sum_{k=1}^n \frac{1}{k^2} \\
& < \frac53\prod_{p \le n} \exp\left(\frac{1}{p}\right)  \\
& = \frac53\exp\left(\sum_{p \le n} \frac{1}{p} \right)
\end{align}$$

Dividing through by 5/3 and taking the natural logarithm of both sides gives
$$\log\log(n + 1) - \log\frac53 < \sum_{p \le n} \frac{1}{p}$$

as desired. Q.E.D.

Using

$$\sum_{k=1}^\infty \frac{1}{k^2} = \frac{\pi^2}6$$

(see the Basel problem), the above constant log 5/3 = 0.51082... can be improved to log π^{2}/6 = 0.4977...; in fact it turns out that
$$\lim_{n \to \infty } \left( \sum_{p \leq n} \frac{1}{p} - \log \log n \right) = M$$

where M = 0.261497... is the Meissel–Mertens constant (somewhat analogous to the much more famous Euler–Mascheroni constant).

=== Proof from Dusart's inequality ===
From Dusart's inequality, we get
$$p_n <  n \log n + n \log \log n \quad\mbox{for } n \ge 6$$

Then
$$\begin{align}
\sum_{n=1}^\infty \frac1{ p_n}
&\ge \sum_{n=6}^\infty \frac{1}{ p_n} \\
&\ge \sum_{n=6}^\infty \frac{1}{ n \log n + n \log \log n} \\
&\ge \sum_{n=6}^\infty \frac{1}{2n \log n} = \infty
\end{align}$$
by the integral test for convergence. This shows that the series on the left diverges.

=== Geometric and harmonic-series proof ===
The following proof is modified from James A. Clarkson.

Define the k-th tail

$$x_{k} = \sum_{n = k+1} ^{\infty} \frac{1}{p_n}.$$

Then for $i \geq 0$, the expansion of $(x_{k})^{i}$ contains at least one term for each reciprocal of a positive integer with exactly $i$ prime factors (counting multiplicities) only from the set $\{ p_{k+1}, p_{k+2}, \cdots \}$. It follows that the geometric series $\sum_{i = 0} ^{\infty} (x_{k})^{i}$ contains at least one term for each reciprocal of a positive integer not divisible by any $p_{n},n\leq k$. But since $1+j(p_{1}p_{2}\cdots p_{k})$ always satisfies this criterion,

$$\sum_{i=0}^{\infty}(x_{k})^{i}>\sum_{j=1}^{\infty} \frac{1}{1+j(p_{1}p_{2} \cdots p_{k})}>\frac{1}{1+p_{1}p_{2} \cdots p_{k}} \sum_{j=1}^{\infty}\frac{1}{j}=\infty$$

by the divergence of the harmonic series. This shows that $x_{k}\geq 1$ for all $k$, and since the tails of a convergent series must themselves converge to zero, this proves divergence.

== Partial sums ==
While the partial sums of the reciprocals of the primes eventually exceed any integer value, they never equal an integer.

One proof is by induction: The first partial sum is 1/2, which has the form odd/even. If the nth partial sum (for n ≥ 1) has the form odd/even, then the (n + 1)st sum is

$$\frac\text{odd}\text{even} + \frac{1}{p_{n+1}} = \frac{\text{odd} \cdot p_{n+1} + \text{even}}{\text{even} \cdot p_{n+1}} = \frac{\text{odd} + \text{even}}\text{even} = \frac\text{odd}\text{even}$$

as the (n + 1)st prime p_{n + 1} is odd; since this sum also has an odd/even form, this partial sum cannot be an integer (because 2 divides the denominator but not the numerator), and the induction continues.

Another proof rewrites the expression for the sum of the first n reciprocals of primes (or indeed the sum of the reciprocals of any finite set of primes) in terms of the least common denominator, which is the product of all these primes. Then each of these primes divides all but one of the numerator terms and hence does not divide the numerator itself; but each prime does divide the denominator. Thus the expression is irreducible and is non-integer.

== See also ==
- Euclid's theorem that there are infinitely many primes
- Small set (combinatorics)
- Brun's theorem, on the convergent sum of reciprocals of the twin primes
- List of sums of reciprocals
