= List of Guggenheim Fellowships awarded in 1993 =

List of Guggenheim Fellowships awarded in 1993

| Fellow | Category | Field of Study |
|---|---|---|
| Richard Abel | Humanities | Film, Video, & Radio Studies |
| Joan Acocella | Humanities | Dance Studies |
| Polly E. Apfelbaum | Creative Arts | Fine Arts |
| Derek Attridge | Humanities | Literary Criticism |
| José Antonio Évora | Humanities | Theatre Arts |
| Barbara A. Baird | Natural Sciences | Molecular & Cellular Biology |
| Debbora Battaglia | | Anthropology & Cultural Studies |
| Virginia Beahan | Creative Arts | Photography |
| José Bedia Valdés | | Fine Arts |
| Frederick C. Beiser | | Philosophy |
| Diana Bellessi | | Poetry |
| Alan Berliner | Creative Arts | Film |
| Michael A. Bernstein | | Literary Criticism |
| Claudio Bertoni Lemus | Creative Arts | Photography |
| Willie Birch | | Fine Arts |
| Blanche McCrary Boyd | | Fiction |
| Phyllis Bramson | | Fine Arts |
| Ross Brann | | Near Eastern Studies |
| Gordon Brotherston | | Latin American Literature |
| Marina S. Brownlee | | Spanish & Portuguese Literature |
| Susan Buck-Morss | | Intellectual & Cultural History |
| Robert Olen Butler | | Fiction |
| Terry P. Caesar | | General Nonfiction |
| Annette Wheeler Cafarelli | | English Literature |
| Mary Carlson | | Fine Arts |
| Nicholas Christopher | | Poetry |
| Patricia E. Cladis | | Physics |
| David Cohen | | Classics |
| Lizabeth Cohen | | U.S. History |
| Samuel K. Cohn | | Italian History |
| Billy Collins | | Poetry |
| Frederick Cooper | | African Studies |
| Alberto Cordero | | Philosophy |
| Marcos Cueto | | Iberian & Latin American History |
| Michael Cunningham | | Fiction |
| Nathan Currier | | Music Composition |
| James E. Cutting | Social Sciences | Psychology |
| Francis Anthony Dahlen | | Earth Science |
| Francis Davis | | Folklore & Popular Culture |
| Jesús Díaz | | Fiction |
| Gary S. De Krey | | British History |
| Regina DeLuise | Creative Arts | Photography |
| Robert Dick | | Music Composition |
| Millicent Dillon | Creative Arts | Biography |
| Ann Douglas | | American Literature |
| Debórah Dwork | | Intellectual & Cultural History |
| Cornelius Eady | Creative Arts | Poetry |
| John Earls | | Anthropology & Cultural Studies |
| Louis Edwards | | Fiction |
| David Felder | Creative Arts | Music Composition |
| Roberto Fernández | Natural Sciences | Physics |
| Gloria Ferrari Pinney | Humanities | Fine Arts Research |
| Arthur Field | Humanities | Renaissance History |
| Jeanne C. Finley | Creative Arts | Video & Audio |
| Karen Finley | Creative Arts | Fine Arts |
| Joel Fisher | Creative Arts | Fine Arts |
| Joseph S. Francisco | Natural Sciences | Chemistry |
| Joe Frank | Creative Arts | Drama & Performance Art |
| Harry G. Frankfurt | Humanities | Philosophy |
| Allen J. Frantzen | Humanities | Medieval Literature |
| Alexander Gelley | | Literary Criticism |
| Paula J. Giddings | Creative Arts | Biography |
| Paul Gootenberg | | Iberian & Latin American History |
| Mary Gordon | | Fiction |
| William L. Graf | | Geography & Environmental Studies |
| Elliott Green | | Fine Arts |
| Gene M. Grossman | | Economics |
| Lars Gustafsson | | Poetry |
| Tomás Gutiérrez Alea | Creative Arts | Film |
| Patricio Guzmán Lozanes | Creative Arts | Film |
| Sarah Hanley | | French History |
| John Harte | | Plant Sciences |
| Christine Leigh Heyrman | | U.S. History |
| Daniel Hillel | | Science Writing |
| Philip Holmes | Natural Sciences | Applied Mathematics |
| Ray Jackendoff | | Psychology |
| Fotis C. Kafatos | | Molecular & Cellular Biology |
| Wendy Kaminer | | General Nonfiction |
| Marilyn A. Katz | | Classics |
| Néstor E. Katz | | Chemistry |
| Thomas DaCosta Kaufmann | | Intellectual & Cultural History |
| Anatoly M. Khazanov | | Religion |
| Laura Kipnis | | Video & Audio |
| Mary Kocol | Creative Arts | Photography |
| Clayton Koelb | | German & Scandinavian Literature |
| Phokion G. Kolaitis | | Computer Science |
| Allen Kurzweil | Creative Arts | Fiction |
| Oliver Lake | | Music Composition |
| David Lamelas | | Fine Arts |
| Mirko Lauer | | General Nonfiction |
| John Lees | | Fine Arts |
| Seth Lerer | Humanities | Medieval Literature |
| Leonid A. Levin | | Computer Science |
| Ker-Chau Li | | Statistics |
| Zachary Lockman | | Near Eastern Studies |
| Diego Luzuriaga | | Music Composition |
| Wyatt MacGaffey | | African Studies |
| Jane Marcus | | English Literature |
| Michael Marcus | | Mathematics |
| Donald Margulies | | Drama & Performance Art |
| Carlos Marichal | | Iberian & Latin American History |
| Gonzalo Martínez de la Escalera | | Molecular & Cellular Biology |
| Lucy McDiarmid | | English Literature |
| Bill McKibben | | General Nonfiction |
| Laura McPhee | Creative Arts | Photography |
| Margaret A. Mills | | Folklore & Popular Culture |
| Andrea Modica | Creative Arts | Photography |
| Abelardo Morell | Creative Arts | Photography |
| Roger Morris | Creative Arts | Biography |
| Telemachos Ch. Mouschovias | | Astronomy—Astrophysics |
| Kirin Narayan | Social Sciences | Anthropology & Cultural Studies |
| Peter M. Narins | Natural Sciences | Neuroscience |
| David R. Nelson | | Physics |
| Kathleen Norris | | General Nonfiction |
| Mary Beth Norton | | U.S. History |
| Thomas Nozkowski | Creative Arts | Fine Arts |
| Tere O'Connor | Creative Arts | Choreography |
| Pablo Ortiz | Creative Arts | Music Composition |
| Larry E. Overman | Natural Sciences | Chemistry |
| Jeevak M. Parpia | | Physics |
| Carole Pateman | | Political Science |
| Richard H. Pells | | U.S. History |
| Gayle Pemberton | | Film, Video, & Radio Studies |
| Mimi Pickering | | Video & Audio |
| Paulo S. Pinheiro | | Political Science |
| A. Mitchell Polinsky | Social Sciences | Law |
| Robert E. Pollack | | Science Writing |
| Carl R. Pope | | Fine Arts |
| Ross Posnock | | American Literature |
| Armand Qualliotine | Creative Arts | Music Composition |
| L. Elizabeth Little Rasmussen | | Organismic Biology & Ecology |
| Bruce Redford | | English Literature |
| Eustáquio J. Reis | | Economics |
| Fritz Ringer | | German & East European History |
| Francesca Rochberg | Humanities | History of Science & Technology |
| Osvaldo E. Sala | Natural Sciences | Plant Sciences |
| Mary Jo Salter | | Poetry |
| Rodolfo Santana Salas | | Drama & Performance Art |
| Peter Saul | | Fine Arts |
| Michael Scammell | | Slavic Literature |
| Carolee Schneemann | | Fine Arts |
| Victor Schrager | Creative Arts | Photography |
| Frederick Seidel | | Poetry |
| Moisés Selman-Lama | | Medicine & Health |
| William C. Sharpe | | Fine Arts Research |
| Linda M. Shires | | English Literature |
| Ana María Shua | | Fiction |
| Miriam Silverberg | | East Asian Studies |
| Samuel C. Silverstein | | Medicine & Health |
| William H. Simon | | Law |
| James L. Skinner | | Chemistry |
| David Soley | | Music Composition |
| Philip Solomon | Creative Arts | Film |
| Marilda A. Oliveira Sotomayor | | Economics |
| Denise Stoklos | | Drama & Performance Art |
| Ann Laura Stoler | | South Asian Studies |
| Suresh Subramani | | Molecular & Cellular Biology |
| Donald K. Swearer | Humanities | Religion |
| Ritsuko Taho | Creative Arts | Fine Arts |
| John H. Thomas | Natural Sciences | Astronomy—Astrophysics |
| Marta Tienda | Social Sciences | Sociology |
| Daniel P. Todes | Humanities | History of Science & Technology |
| George Tsebelis | Social Sciences | Political Science |
| Olke C. Uhlenbeck | Natural Sciences | Molecular & Cellular Biology |
| Greg Urban | Social Sciences | Anthropology & Cultural Studies |
| Marcelo Viana | Natural Sciences | Mathematics |
| Judith R. Walkowitz | Humanities | British History |
| Mary C. Waters | Social Sciences | Sociology |
| Mia Westerlund Roosen | Creative Arts | Fine Arts |
| John C. Wingfield | Natural Sciences | Organismic Biology & Ecology |
| Susan Wolf | Humanities | Philosophy |
| Janet Wolff | Humanities | Fine Arts Research |

== See also ==
- Guggenheim Fellowship
