= Walkowitz =

Walkowitz is a surname. Notable people with the surname include:

- Abraham Walkowitz (1878–1965), American painter
- Daniel Walkowitz (born 1942), American historian
- Judith R. Walkowitz (born 1945), American historian
