= Barbara Baird =

Barbara Baird may refer to:

- Barbara Baird Filliter (born 1952), née Baird, Canadian politician
- Barbara A. Baird (born 1951), American cell biologist and biophysicist
