= Midnight Train =

Midnight Train may refer to:

- Midnight Train (film), a 2013 Chinese film
- "The Midnight Train", a traditional African-American song published by Dorothy Scarborough and by Carl Sandburg; recorded by Dan Zanes and others
- Midnight Train, an album by Jorja Chalmers (2021)
- Midnight Train (album), a 2020 album by Sauti Sol
- "Midnight Train", a song by Bryan Ferry from Avonmore
- "Midnight Train", a song by Buddy Guy from Heavy Love (1998)
- "Midnight Train", a song by The Charlie Daniels Band from Homesick Heroes
- "Midnight Train", a song by Chet Atkins and The Country All-Stars from Jazz from the Hills
- "Midnight Train", a song by Ludacris from Incognegro
- "Midnight Train", a song by The Monkees from Changes
- "Midnight Train", a song by The Rock and Roll Trio
- "Midnight Train", a song by Sau
- "Midnight Train", a song by Sam Smith from The Thrill of It All
- "Midnight Train", a song by The Three Degrees from International
- "Midnight Train", a song that appeared in Nickelodeon's cartoon ChalkZone in the episode "Double Trouble"
- ”Midnight Train”, a song by Sauti Sol
- Midnight Trains, a French railroad company
- The Midnight Train a novel by Matt Haig

== See also ==
- Bridge and torch problem or The Midnight Train and Dangerous crossing, a logic puzzle
- List of train songs
- The Midnight Meat Train, a 2008 horror film
- The Midnight Special (train)
- "Midnight Train to Georgia", a song by Gladys Knight & the Pips
- Midnight Train to Georgia (album), a 1995 album by Cissy Houston
- Riding the Midnight Train, an American folk music anthology album
- "Don't Stop Believin'", a song by Journey using the term "midnight train" twice
