= Margaret Mills (folklorist) =

American folklorist

Margaret Ann Mills (born 1946) is an American folklorist, and educator. She is a professor emerita of the Department of Near East Languages and Cultures at Ohio State University.

== Early life and education ==
Margaret Mills was born in 1946 in Boston, Massachusetts. She was raised in Seattle, Washington, where her Italian-born mother was raised. Although both of her parents were physicians, Mills's interests carried her in a different direction.

Margaret Mills graduated cum laude from Radcliffe College in 1968 with a B.A. degree in general studies. She received a PhD (1978) from Harvard University in Comparative Literature and Near Eastern Languages and Culture, with Cultural Anthropology. Mills's dissertation, Oral Narrative in Afghanistan: The Individual in Tradition, was directed by Albert Bates Lord, main proponent of the widely influential oral theory of epic composition.

== Work history ==
Mills's field research has focused on folklore of Persia, Afghanistan, the former Soviet Tajikistan, and Pakistan. She has conducted research on the impact of gender in storytelling found within certain cultures.

After graduation, Mills worked for a year as a United States Liaison Officer in Cambridge, Massachusetts, for the University of Mazandaran in Babolsar, Iran. She spent another year as Field Ethnography Consultant for the Denver WIN Field Observation Study. Between May 1980 and April 1982, Mills held a National Endowment for the Humanities (NEH) grant to prepare her second book manuscript.

After one quarter as a visiting lecturer at the University of Washington in the spring of 1982, Mills became Associate Dean of Students and dean of women at Pomona College in Claremont, California.

In 1983, Mills joined the University of Pennsylvania faculty, spending 13 years in the Folklore and Folklife Department. In 1998, Mills joined Ohio State University as professor and chair of the department of Near Eastern languages and cultures (1998 to 2003). At OSU she was a faculty associate of the Center for Folklore Studies and the Mershon Center for Strategic Studies, as well as an adjunct professor of anthropology. Mills retired from Ohio State University in June 2012. After having spent most of her career in Pennsylvania and Ohio, with research years in Afghanistan, Pakistan and Tajikistan, she retired to the Pacific Northwest in June 2012.

== American Folklore Society ==
Margaret Mills joined the American Folklore Society (AFS) in 1971. Mills served on the AFS Program Committee in 1993 and 2000, on the Long-Range Planning Committee from 1997 to 1999, and on the executive board from 1999 to 2002. In 2012, Mills ran for president of AFS but lost to Michael Ann Williams, head of the department of folk studies and anthropology at Western Kentucky University.

Concerning the future of AFS, Margaret Mills states, "Diversity issues in AFS as in our society at large need more address. We have a (complex) opportunity to make common cause and deepen our conversations with folklorists from abroad whom we invite for AFS meetings and exchange activities."

== Honors and awards ==
- "Tales of Trickery, Tales of Endurance: Gender, Performance, and Politics in the Islamic World and Beyond" – A Conference in Honor of Margaret Mills at Mershon Center for International Security Studies (2012).
- United States Department of State, Title VIII Fellowship for Ethnolinguistic Field Study of Everyday Ethical and Political Speech in Post-Soviet Tajikistan (2005).
- John Simon Guggenheim Foundation Fellowship (1993–1994).
- Chicago Folklore Prize for Best Academic Book in Folklore for Rhetorics and Politics in Afghan Traditional Storytelling (1993).
- Fulbright-Hays Group Faculty Training Seminars Grant, Sri Lanka. Trainee, specializing in Women's Studies and Folklore of Sri Lanka (1993).
- U.S. Dept of Education Fulbright-Hays Faculty Research Fellowship, investigating effect of education development on women's traditional activities in Ishkoman Valley, Northern Areas, Pakistan (1990).
- National Endowment for the Humanities Translation Grant, to prepare for publication translations of folktales and romances from Afghan oral tradition in Persian (Dari) language (1980–1982).
- AAUW Dissertation Grant (1975–1976).
- Fulbright-Hayes Dissertation Grant in Afghanistan (1975).
- National Science Foundation Supplementary Grant to Improve the Quality of Social Science Research (1974–1976).

== Selected publications ==
- Cupid and Psyche in Afghanistan: An international Tale in Cultural Context (Occasional Paper (Asia Society. Afghanistan Council), No. 14, Spring/1978).
- Oral Narrative in Afghanistan: The Individual in Tradition (Garland Publishers Harvard Folklore Dissertation Series, 1990).
- Rhetorics and Politics in Afghan Traditional Storytelling (University of Pennsylvania Press, 1991).
- "Feminist Theory and the Study of Folklore: A Twenty-Year Trajectory toward Theory," in Charles Briggs and Amy Shuman, eds., Theorizing Folklore: Toward New Perspectives on the Politis of Culture, Special Issue of Western Folklore 52: 2,3,4, pp. 173–192 (Apr-Oct 1993).
- "Family Oral Histories in the Wider History of War: Afghanistan" in Suomen Antropologi: Journal of the Finnish Anthropological Society 21.2, pp. 2–11 (1996).
- "The Gender of the Trick: Female Tricksters and Male Narrators" in Asian Folklore Studies 60:2, Special Issue on Folklore of the Iranian Region, John Perry, ed., pp. 238–258 (2001).
- "Appropriating Women’s Agendas" with Sally L. Kitch, co-author, Peace Review 16:1, pp. 65–73 (2004).
- "Arts: Storytellers and Raconteurs: Afghanistan," in Encyclopedia of Women in Islamic Countries, eds. Suad Joseph and Afsaneh Najmabadi (Macmillan, 2007).
- "Women’s Tricks: From Folklore to Everyday Activism" in Women of Afghanistan after 9/11, ed. Jennifer Heath Collum (U. California Press, 2010).
- "Between Covered and Covert: Traditions, Stereotypes, and Afghan Women's Agency," in Land of the Unconquerable The Lives of Contemporary Afghan Women, eds. J. Heath and A Zahedi, (U. California Press, 2010).
- "Destroying Patriarchy to Save It: Safdár Tawakkoli's Afghan Boxwoman," in Transgressive Tales: Queering the Grimms, eds. K. Turner and P. Greenhill, (Wayne State U. Press, 2012).
- "Victimhood as Agency: Afghan Women's Memoirs," in Orientalism and War, eds. T. Barkawi and K. Stanski, (Columbia U. Press, 2012).
