= Alcuin's sequence =

In mathematics, Alcuin's sequence, named after Alcuin of York, is the sequence of coefficients of the power-series expansion of:

$$\frac{x^3}{(1-x^2)(1-x^3)(1-x^4)} = x^3 + x^5 + x^6 + 2x^7 + x^8 + 3x^9 + \cdots.$$

The sequence begins with these integers:

0, 0, 0, 1, 0, 1, 1, 2, 1, 3, 2, 4, 3, 5, 4, 7, 5, 8, 7, 10, 8, 12, 10, 14, 12, 16, 14, 19, 16, 21 (sequence A005044 in the OEIS)

The nth term indexed from zero, i.e., the coefficient of $x^n$ in the power series, is the number of triangles with integer sides and perimeter n. It is also the number of triangles with distinct integer sides and perimeter n + 6, i.e. number of triples (a, b, c) such that 1 ≤ a < b < c < a + b, a + b + c = n + 6.

If one deletes the three leading zeros, then it is the number of ways in which n empty casks, n casks half-full of wine and n full casks can be distributed to three persons in such a way that each one gets the same number of casks and the same amount of wine. This is the generalization of problem 12 appearing in Propositiones ad Acuendos Juvenes ("Problems to Sharpen the Young") usually attributed to Alcuin. That problem is given as,

Problem 12: A certain father died and left as an inheritance to his three sons 30 glass flasks, of which 10 were full of oil, another 10 were half full, while another 10 were empty. Divide the oil and flasks so that an equal share of the commodities should equally come down to the three sons, both of oil and glass.
In Latin: "XII. Propositio de quodam paterfamilias et tribus filius eius : Quidam paterfamilias moriens dimisit haereditatem tribus filiis suis, XXX ampullas uitreas, quarum decem fuerunt plenae oleo. Aliae decem dimidiae. Tertiae decem uacuae. Diuidat, qui potest, oleum et ampullas ut unicuique eorum de tribus filiis aequaliter obueniat tam de uitro, quam de oleo."

The term "Alcuin's sequence" may be traced back to D. Olivastro's 1993 book on mathematical games, Ancient Puzzles: Classical Brainteasers and Other Timeless Mathematical Games of the Last 10 Centuries (Bantam, New York).

The sequence with the three leading zeros deleted is equivalently the sequence of coefficients of the power-series expansion of

$$\frac{1}{(1-x^2)(1-x^3)(1-x^4)} = 1 + x^2 + x^3 + 2x^4 + x^5 + 3x^6 + \cdots.$$

This sequence has also been called Alcuin's sequence by some authors.
