= Alcuin =

8th-century English scholar, clergyman, poet, and teacher

Alcuin of York
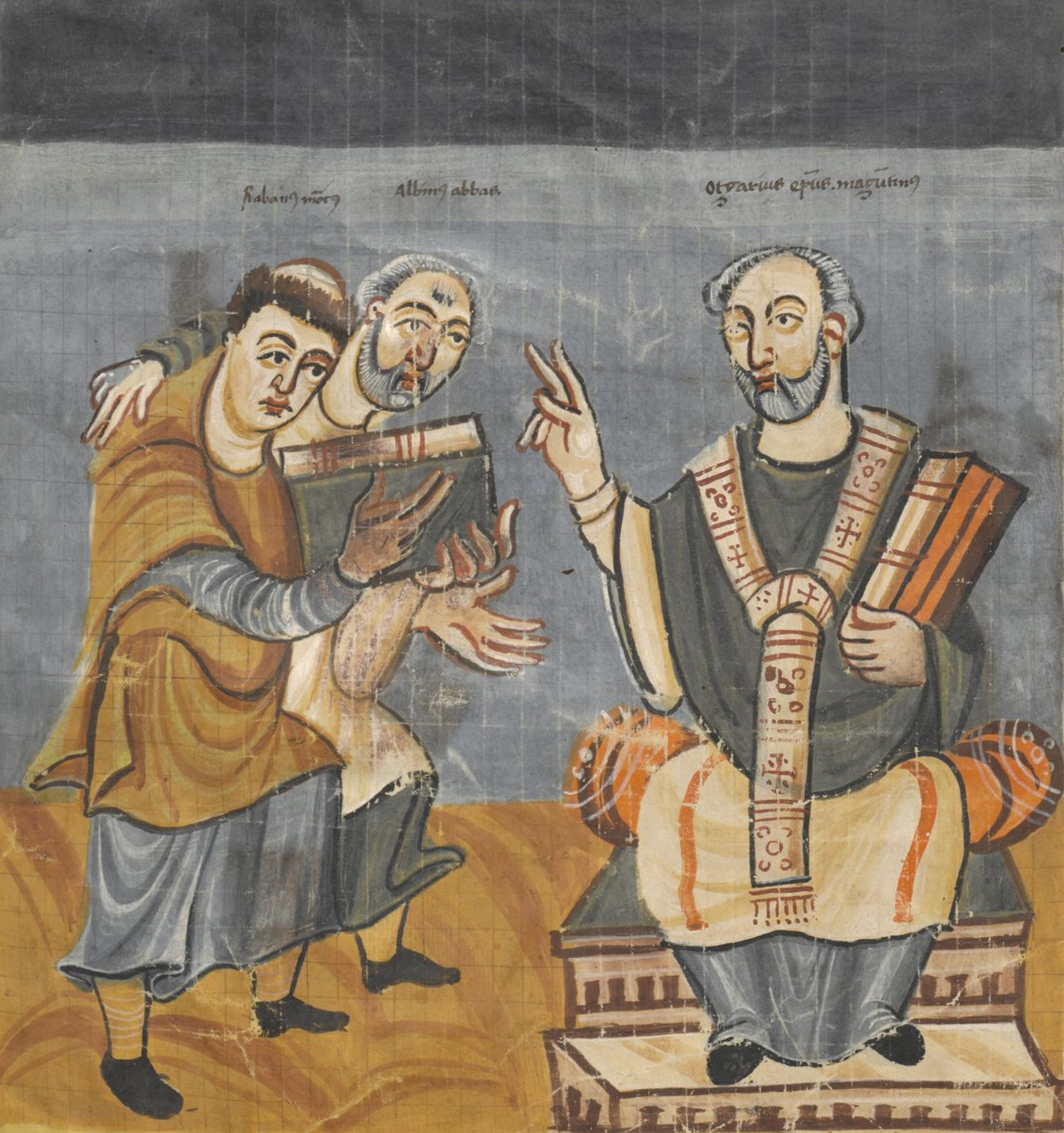
- A Carolingian manuscript, c. 831. Rabanus Maurus (left), with Alcuin (middle), dedicating his work to Archbishop Otgar of Mainz (right)
- Born: c. 735; York, Northumbria
- Died: 19 May 804 (aged around 69); Tours, Francia
- Occupation: Deacon of the Catholic Church (Latin Church)

Academic background
- Influences: Ecgbert of York

Academic work
- Era: Medieval philosophy; Carolingian Renaissance
- Main interests: Mathematics; Philosophy; Christian theology; Poetry
- Notable works: Propositiones ad Acuendos Juvenes; Quaestiones in Genesim

Alcuin of York (/ˈælkwɪn/; Latin: Flaccus Albinus Alcuinus; c. 735 – 19 May 804), also called Ealhwine, Alhwin, or Alchoin, was an Anglo-Saxon scholar, clergyman, poet, and teacher from York, Northumbria, who was active in the Carolingian Empire in the 8th century. He was born around 735 and became the student of Archbishop Ecgbert at York. At the invitation of Charlemagne, he became a leading scholar and teacher at the Carolingian court, where he remained a figure in the 780s and 790s. Before that, he was also a court chancellor in Aachen. "The most learned man anywhere to be found", according to Einhard's Life of Charlemagne (c. 817–833), he is considered among the most important intellectual architects of the Carolingian Renaissance. Among his pupils were many of the dominant intellectuals of the Carolingian era.

Alcuin wrote many theological and dogmatic treatises, as well as a few grammatical works and a number of poems. In 796, he was made abbot of Marmoutier Abbey, in Tours, where he worked on perfecting the Carolingian minuscule script. He remained there until his death.

== Biography ==
=== Background ===
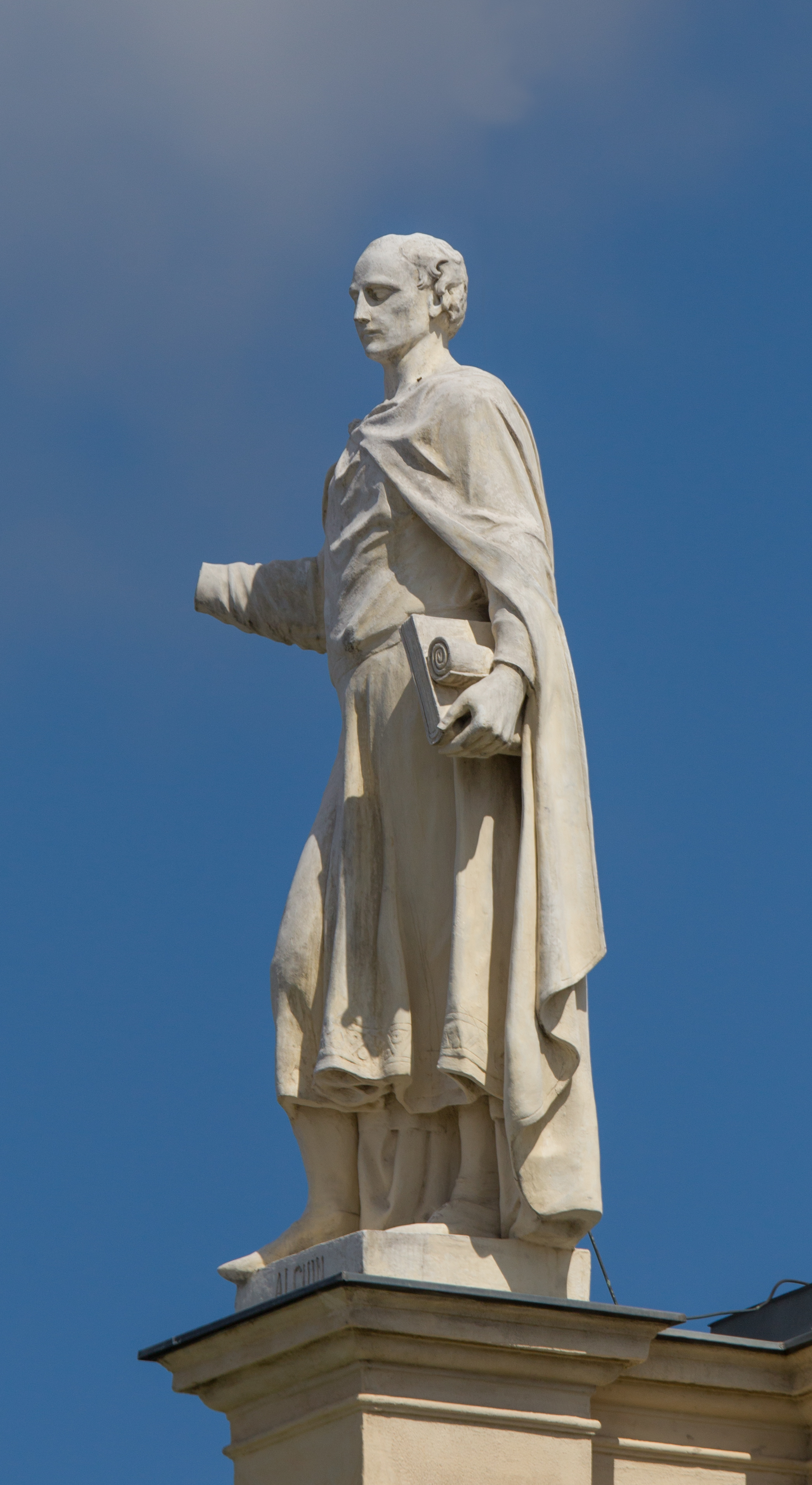
Alcuin, roof figure, Museum of History of Arts, Vienna

Alcuin was born in Northumbria, presumably sometime in the 730s. Virtually nothing is known of his parents, family background, or origin. In common hagiographical fashion, the Vita Alcuini asserts that Alcuin was of "noble English stock", and this statement has usually been accepted by scholars. Alcuin's own work only mentions such collateral kinsmen as Wilgils of Ripon, father of the missionary saint Willibrord; and Beornrad (also spelled Beornred), abbot of Echternach and bishop of Sens. Willibrord, Alcuin and Beornrad were all related by blood.

In his Life of St Willibrord, Alcuin writes that Wilgils, called a Pater familias, had founded an oratory and church at the mouth of the Humber, which had fallen into Alcuin's possession by inheritance. Because in early Anglo-Latin writing paterfamilias ("head of a family, householder") usually referred to a ceorl ("churl"), Donald A. Bullough suggests that Alcuin's family was of cierlisc ("churlish") status: i.e., free but subordinate to a noble lord, and that Alcuin and other members of his family rose to prominence through beneficial connections with the aristocracy. If so, Alcuin's origins may lie in the southern part of what was formerly known as Deira.

=== York ===
The young Alcuin came to the cathedral church of York during the golden age of Archbishop Ecgbert and his brother, the Northumbrian King Eadberht. Ecgbert had been a disciple of the Venerable Bede, who urged him to raise York to an archbishopric. King Eadberht and Archbishop Ecgbert oversaw the re-energising and reorganisation of the English church, with an emphasis on reforming the clergy and on the tradition of learning that Bede had begun. Ecgbert was devoted to Alcuin, who thrived under his tutelage.

The York school was renowned as a centre of learning in the liberal arts, literature, and science, as well as in religious matters. From here, Alcuin drew inspiration for the school he would lead at the Frankish court. He revived the school with the trivium and quadrivium disciplines, writing a codex on the trivium, while his student Hrabanus wrote one on the quadrivium.

Alcuin graduated to become a teacher during the 750s. His ascendancy to the headship of the York school, the ancestor of St Peter's School, began after Æthelbert of York became Archbishop of York in 767. Around the same time, Alcuin became a deacon in the church. He was never ordained a priest. Though no real evidence shows that he took monastic vows, he lived as if he had.

In 781, King Ælfwald I of Northumbria sent Alcuin to Rome to petition the Pope for official confirmation of York's status as an archbishopric and to confirm the election of the new archbishop, Eanbald I. On his way home, he met Charlemagne (whom he had met once before), this time in the Italian city of Parma. (Note: Mayr-Harting 2016, p. 207 asserts Charlemagne met Alcuin – for the second time – at Parma in 781. Story 2005, p. 137 reports that Alcuin had previously been sent to Charlemagne by Ethelbert.)

=== Charlemagne ===
Alcuin's intellectual curiosity allowed him to be reluctantly persuaded to join Charlemagne's court. He joined an illustrious group of scholars whom Charlemagne had gathered around him, the mainsprings of the Carolingian Renaissance: Peter of Pisa, Paulinus II of Aquileia, Rado, and Abbot Saint Fulrad. Alcuin would later write, "the Lord was calling me to the service of King Charles".

Alcuin became master of the Palace School of Charlemagne in Aachen (Urbs Regale) in 782. It had been founded by the king's ancestors as a place for the education of the royal children (mostly in manners and the ways of the court). However, Charlemagne wanted to include the liberal arts, and most importantly, the study of religion. From 782 to 790, Alcuin taught Charlemagne himself, his sons Pepin and Louis, as well as young men sent to be educated at court, and the young clerics attached to the palace chapel. Bringing with him from York his assistants Pyttel, Sigewulf, and Joseph, Alcuin revolutionised the educational standards of the Palace School, introducing Charlemagne to the liberal arts and creating a personalised atmosphere of scholarship and learning, to the extent that the institution came to be known as the "school of Master Albinus".

In this role as adviser, he took issue with the emperor's policy of forcing pagans to be baptised on pain of death, arguing, "Faith is a free act of the will, not a forced act. We must appeal to the conscience, not compel it by violence. You can force people to be baptised, but you cannot force them to believe". His arguments seem to have prevailed – Charlemagne abolished the death penalty for paganism in 797.

Charlemagne gathered the best men of every land in his court and became far more than just the king at the centre. It seems that he made many of these men his closest friends and counsellors. They referred to him as "David", a reference to the Biblical king David. Alcuin soon found himself on intimate terms with Charlemagne and the other men at court, where pupils and masters were known by affectionate and jesting nicknames. Alcuin himself was known as 'Albinus' or 'Flaccus'. While at Aachen, Alcuin bestowed pet names upon his pupils – derived mainly from Virgil's Eclogues. According to the Encyclopædia Britannica, "He loved Charlemagne and enjoyed the king's esteem, but his letters reveal that his fear of him was as great as his love."

After the death of Pope Adrian I, Alcuin was commissioned by Charlemagne to compose an epitaph for Adrian. The epitaph was inscribed on black stone quarried at Aachen and carried to Rome where it was set over Adrian's tomb in the south transept of St. Peter's Basilica just before Charlemagne's coronation in the basilica on Christmas Day 800.

=== Return to Northumbria and back to Francia ===
In 790, Alcuin returned from the court of Charlemagne to England, to which he had remained attached. He dwelt there for some time, but Charlemagne then invited him back to help in the fight against the Adoptionist heresy, which was at that time making great progress in Toledo, the old capital of the Visigoths and still a major city for the Christians under Islamic rule in Spain. He is believed to have had contacts with Beatus of Liébana, from the Kingdom of Asturias, who fought against Adoptionism. At the Council of Frankfurt in 794, Alcuin upheld the orthodox doctrine against the views expressed by Felix of Urgel, an heresiarch according to the Catholic Encyclopedia. Having failed during his stay in Northumbria to influence King Æthelred I in the conduct of his reign, Alcuin never returned home.

He was back at Charlemagne's court by at least mid-792, writing a series of letters to Æthelred, to Hygbald, Bishop of Lindisfarne, and to Æthelhard, Archbishop of Canterbury in the succeeding months, dealing with the Viking attack on Lindisfarne in July 793. These letters and Alcuin's poem on the subject, "De clade Lindisfarnensis monasterii", provide the only significant contemporary account of these events. In his description of the Viking attack, he wrote: "Never before has such terror appeared in Britain. Behold the church of St Cuthbert, splattered with the blood of God's priests, robbed of its ornaments."

=== Tours and death ===
In 796, Alcuin was in his 60s. He hoped to be free from court duties and upon the death of Abbot Itherius of Saint Martin at Tours, Charlemagne put Marmoutier Abbey into Alcuin's care, with the understanding that he should be available if the king ever needed his counsel. There, he encouraged the work of the monks on the beautiful Carolingian minuscule script, ancestor of modern Roman typefaces using a mixture of upper- and lower-case letters. Latin paleography in the 8th century leaves little room for a single origin of the script, and sources contradict his importance as no proof has been found of his direct involvement in the creation of the script. Carolingian minuscule was already in use before Alcuin arrived in Francia. Most likely he was responsible for copying and preserving the script while at the same time restoring the purity of the form.

Alcuin died on 19 May 804, some 10 years before the emperor, and was buried at St. Martin's Church under an epitaph that partly read:

Dust, worms, and ashes now ...
Alcuin my name, wisdom I always loved,
Pray, reader, for my soul.

The majority of details on Alcuin's life come from his letters and poems. Also, autobiographical sections are in Alcuin's poem on York and in the Vita Alcuini, a hagiography written for him at Ferrières in the 820s, possibly based in part on the memories of Sigwulf, one of Alcuin's pupils.

== Scholarly and literary output ==
=== Mathematician ===
The collection of mathematical and logical word problems entitled Propositiones ad acuendos juvenes ("Problems to Sharpen Youths") is sometimes attributed to Alcuin. In a 799 letter to Charlemagne, the scholar claimed to have sent "certain figures of arithmetic for the joy of cleverness", which some scholars have identified with the Propositiones. (Note: A more skeptical attitude toward Alcuin's authorship of this text and others is taken by Gorman 2002, pp. 101–130)

The text contains about 53 mathematical word problems (with solutions), in no particular pedagogical order. Among the most famous of these problems are: four that involve river crossings, including the problem of three anxious brothers, each of whom has an unmarried sister whom he cannot leave alone with either of the other men lest she be defiled (Problem 17); the problem of the wolf, goat, and cabbage (Problem 18); and the problem of "the two adults and two children where the children weigh half as much as the adults" (Problem 19). Alcuin's sequence is the solution to one of the problems of that book.

=== Theologian ===
Alcuin's work as a theologian was more concerned with conservation than originality. His nine scriptural commentaries—on Genesis, the Psalms, the Song of Solomon, Ecclesiastes, Hebrew Names, the Gospel of John, the Epistles to Titus, Philemon, and the Hebrews, The Sayings of St. Paul, and the Apocalypse—consist mostly of sentences taken from the Church Fathers, the apparent motive being to collect into convenient form the observations on the more important scriptural passages of the best commentators who had preceded him. Alcuin also engaged in textual criticism of the Vulgate, which had many variant readings in his time. Four Bibles are shown by the dedicatory poems affixed to them to have been prepared by him, or under his direction at Tours, probably during the years 799–801. Whatever the exact changes made by Alcuin in the Bible text may have been, the known disposition of the man—that he intended to recover Jerome's original text as much as possible—no less than the limits of the scholarship of his time, makes it certain that these changes were not of a far-reaching kind.

Of the three brief moral treatises Alcuin has left us, two, De virtutibus et vitiis, and De animae ratione, are largely abridgments of the writing of Augustine on the same subjects, while the third, "On the Confession of Sins," is a concise exposition of the nature of confession, addressed to the monks of Fulda. Closely allied to his moral writings in spirit and purpose are his sketches of the lives of saints Martin of Tours, Vedast, Richarius, and Willibrord, the last being a biography of considerable length.

Alcuin opposed Spanish Adoptionism, a Christological viewpoint advanced by bishops Felix of Urgell and Elipandus of Toledo.

=== Liturgist ===
Besides his fame as an educator and a theologian, Alcuin was also the principal agent of the liturgical reform accomplished under the authority of Charlemagne. Upon Charlemagne's accession the Gallican Rite prevailed in France, but it was so modified by local customs and traditions as to constitute a serious obstacle to complete ecclesiastical unity. It was the purpose of the king to substitute the Roman Rite in place of the Gallican, or at least to bring about such a revision of the latter as to make it substantially one with the Roman. The strong leaning of Alcuin towards Roman traditions, combined with his conservative character and the universal authority of his name, qualified him for the accomplishment of a change which the royal authority in itself was powerless to effect.

The first of Alcuin's liturgical works appears to have been a homilary, or collection of sermons in Latin for use by priests. Another liturgical work of Alcuin consists of a collection of readings to be read on Sundays and holy days throughout the year, the Comes ab Albino ex Caroli imp. praecepto emendatus. As, previous to his time, the portions of Scripture to be read at Mass were often merely indicated on the margins of the Bibles used, the Comes commended itself by its convenience, and as he followed Roman usage here also, the result was another advance in the way of conformity to the Roman liturgy. The work of Alcuin which had the greatest and most lasting influence in this direction, however, was the missal which he compiled; prescribed as the official liturgical book of the Frankish church, Alcuin's missal soon came to be commonly used throughout Europe and was largely instrumental in bringing about uniformity in respect to the liturgy of the Mass in the whole Latin Church. Other liturgical productions of Alcuin were a collection of votive Masses drawn up for the monks of Fulda, a treatise called De psalmorum usu, a breviary for laymen, and a brief explanation of the ceremonies of baptism.

=== Literary influence ===
Alcuin made the abbey school into a model of excellence and students flocked to it. He had many manuscripts copied using outstandingly beautiful calligraphy, the Carolingian minuscule based on round and legible uncial letters. He wrote many letters to his English friends, to Arno, bishop of Salzburg and above all to Charlemagne. These letters (of which 311 are extant) are filled mainly with pious meditations, but they form an important source of information as to the literary and social conditions of the time and are the most reliable authority for the history of humanism during the Carolingian age. Alcuin trained the numerous monks of the abbey in piety, and in the midst of these pursuits, he died.

Alcuin is the most prominent figure of the Carolingian Renaissance, in which three main periods have been distinguished: in the first of these, up to the arrival of Alcuin at the court, the Italians occupy a central place; in the second, Alcuin and the English are dominant; in the third (from 804), the influence of Theodulf of Orléans is preponderant.

Alcuin also developed manuals used in his educational work – a grammar and works on rhetoric and dialectics. These are written in the form of a dialogue, and in two of them the interlocutors are Charlemagne and Alcuin. He wrote several theological treatises: a De fide Trinitatis, and commentaries on the Bible. Alcuin is credited with inventing the first known question mark, though it did not resemble the modern symbol.

Alcuin transmitted to the Franks the knowledge of Latin culture, which had existed in Anglo-Saxon England. A number of his works still exist. Besides some graceful epistles in the style of Venantius Fortunatus, he wrote some long poems, and notably he is the author of a history (in verse) of the church at York, Versus de patribus, regibus et sanctis Eboracensis ecclesiae. At the same time, he is noted for making one of the only explicit comments on Old English poetry surviving from the early Middle Ages, in a letter to one Speratus, the bishop of an unnamed English see (possibly Unwona of Leicester): "verba Dei legantur in sacerdotali convivio: ibi decet lectorem audiri, non citharistam; sermones patrum, non carmina gentilium. Quid Hinieldus cum Christo?" ("Let God's words be read at the episcopal dinner-table. It is right that a reader should be heard, not a harpist, patristic discourse, not pagan song. What has Ingeld to do with Christ?").

==== Possible homoeroticism ====
Some historians, including the queer historian John Boswell, have identified what they consider to be a homoerotic or homosexual subtext in Alcuin's writings. Others, like Allen Frantzen, have disputed this characterisation of his work; Frantzen identifies Alcuin's language with that of medieval Christian amicitia or friendship. (Note: See also Jaeger 1991) Douglas Dales and Rowan Williams say "the use of language drawn [by Alcuin] from the Song of Songs transforms apparently erotic language into something within Christian friendship – 'an ordained affection'". According to David Clark, passages in some of Alcuin's writings can be seen to display homosocial desire, even possibly homoerotic imagery, though he argues that it is not possible to necessarily determine whether they were the result of an outward expression of erotic feelings on the part of Alcuin.

== Legacy ==
Saint Alcuin of York
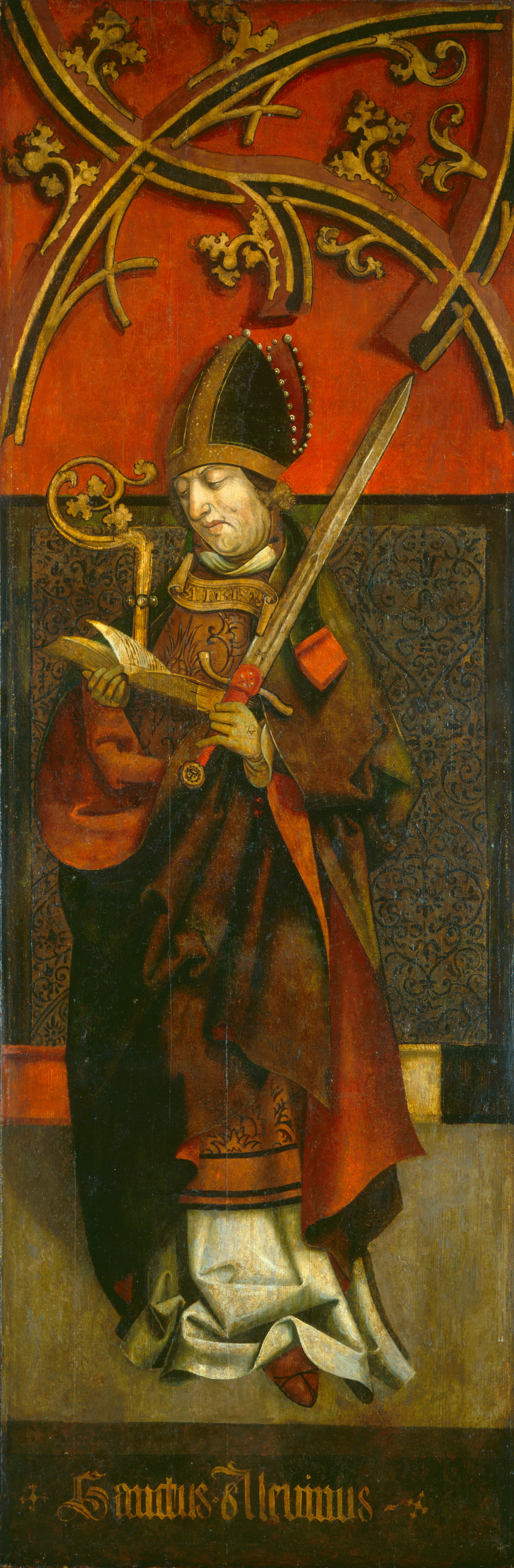
- Painting subtitled Sanctus Alcuinus ('Saint Alcuin'), Tyrol, early 16th century
- Venerated in: Anglicanism; Catholic Church
- Feast: 20 May

Alcuin is honoured in the Church of England and in the Episcopal Church on 20 May, the first available day after the day of his death (as Dunstan is celebrated on 19 May).

Alcuin is also traditionally and regionally venerated as a Blessed in the Catholic Church, and by Eastern Orthodox Christians in the British Isles specifically. The Orthodox Fellowship of John the Baptist publishes a liturgical calendar that is widely used by members of Eastern Orthodox denominations in that region, and this calendar includes a feast for St Alcuin.

Alcuin College, one of the colleges of the University of York, is named after him. In January 2020, Alcuin was the subject of the BBC Radio 4 programme In Our Time. In December 2024, Alcuin was prominently featured in Part 2 of a 3-part podcast series on Charlemagne in The Rest Is History.

At the entrance of St. Michael's Catholic Cemetery, a private cemetery in Hong Kong, two lines of his poem "Ashes and Dust" are demonstrated as Duilian; which is "You are now, traveller, what I once was, and what I am now you will one day become."

== Selected works ==
For a complete census of Alcuin's works, see Marie-Hélène Jullien and Françoise Perelman, eds., Clavis scriptorum latinorum medii aevi: Auctores Galliae 735–987, Tomus II – Alcuinus, Turnhout, Brepols, 1999.

=== Poetry ===
- Carmina, ed. Ernst Dümmler, MGH Poetae Latini aevi Carolini I, Berlin, Weidmann, 1881, 160–351.
  - Godman, Peter, trad., Poetry of the Carolingian Renaissance, Norman, University of Oklahoma Press, 1985, 118–149.
  - Stella, Francesco, trad., comm., La poesia carolingia, Firenze: Le Lettere, 1995, pp. 94–96, 152–161, 266–267, 302–307, 364–371, 399–404, 455–457, 474–477, 503–507.
  - Isbell, Harold, trad.; The Last Poets of Imperial Rome, Baltimore, Penguin, 1971.
- Poem on York, Versus de patribus, regibus et sanctis Euboricensis ecclesiae, ed. and trad. Peter Godman, The Bishops, Kings, and Saints of York, Oxford, Clarendon Press, 1982.
- De clade Lindisfarnensis monasterii, "On the destruction of the monastery of Lindisfarne" (Carmen 9, ed. Dümmler, pp. 229–235).

=== Letters ===
Of Alcuin's letters, over 310 have survived:

- Epistolae, ed. Ernst Dümmler, MGH, Epistolae, IV.2, Berlin, Weidmann, 1895, 1–493;
- Jaffé, Philipp, Ernst Dümmler, and W. Wattenbach, eds. Monumenta Alcuiniana, Berlin, Weidmann, 1873, 132–897;
- Chase, Colin, ed. Two Alcuin Letter-books, Toronto, Pontifical Institute of Mediaeval Studies, 1975;
- Allott, Stephen, trad. Alcuin of York, c. AD 732 to 804 – His life and letters, York, William Sessions, 1974;
- Sturgeon, Thomas G., trad. The Letters of Alcuin – Part One, the Aachen Period (762–796). Harvard University PhD thesis, 1953.

=== Didactic works ===
- Ars grammatica. PL 101, 854–902;
- De orthographia, ed. H. Keil, Grammatici Latini VII, 1880, 295–312; ed. Sandra Bruni, Alcuino de orthographia, Florence, SISMEL, 1997;
- De dialectica, PL 101, 950–976;
- Disputatio regalis et nobilissimi juvenis Pippini cum Albino scholastico, "Dialogue of Pepin, the Most Noble and Royal Youth, with the Teacher Albinus", ed. L. W. Daly and W. Suchier, Altercatio Hadriani Augusti et Epicteti Philosophi, Urbana, IL, University of Illinois Press, 1939, 134–146; ed. Wilhelm Wilmanns, "Disputatio regalis et nobilissimi juvenis Pippini cum Albino scholastic", Zeitschrift für deutsches Altertum, 14 (1869), 530–555, 562.
- Disputatio de rhetorica et de virtutibus sapientissimi regis Carli et Albini magistri, ed. and trad. Wilbur Samuel Howell, The Rhetoric of Alcuin and Charlemagne, New York, Russell and Russell, 1965 (1941); ed. C. Halm, Rhetorici Latini Minores, Leipzig, Teubner, 1863, 523–550;
- "De virtutibus et vitiis moral treatise (dedicated to Count Wido of Brittany, 799–800), PL 101, 613–638". A new critical edition is being prepared for the Corpus Christianorum, Continuatio Medievalis;
- De animae ratione (ad Eulaliam virginem) (written for Gundrada, Charlemagne's cousin), PL 101, 639–650;
- De Cursu et Saltu Lunae ac Bissexto, astronomical treatise, PL 101, 979–1002;
- (?) Propositiones ad acuendos iuvenes, ed. Menso Folkerts, "Die älteste mathematische Aufgabensammlung in lateinischer Sprache, Die Alkuin zugeschriebenen Propositiones ad acuendos iuvenes; Überlieferung, Inhalt, Kritische Edition", in idem, Essays on Early Medieval Mathematics: The Latin Tradition, Aldershot, Ashgate, 2003.

=== Theology ===
- Compendium in Canticum Canticorum: Alcuino, Commento al Cantico dei cantici – con i commenti anonimi Vox ecclesie e Vox antique ecclesie, ed. Rossana Guglielmetti, Firenze, SISMEL 2004;
- Quaestiones in Genesim, PL 100, 515–566;
- De Fide Sanctae Trinitatis et de Incarnatione Christi; Quaestiones de Sancta Trinitate, ed. E. Knibbs and E. Ann Matter (Corpus Christianorum – Continuatio Mediaevalis 249, Brepols, 2012).

=== Hagiography ===
- Vita II Vedastis episcopi Atrebatensis, Revision of the earlier Vita Vedastis by Jonas of Bobbio, Patrologia Latina, 101, 663–682;
- Vita Richarii confessoris Centulensis, Revision of an earlier anonymous life, MGH Scriptores Rerum Merovingicarum, 4, 381–401;
- Vita Willibrordi archiepiscopi Traiectensis, ed. W. Levison, Passiones vitaeque sanctorum aevi Merovingici, MGH Scriptores Rerum Merovingicarum, 7, 81–141.

== See also ==
- Propositiones ad Acuendos Juvenes
- Carolingian art
- Carolingian Empire
- Category: Carolingian period
- Correctory
- Codex Vindobonensis 795

== Notes and references ==
=== Sources ===
- Alcuin (n.d.). Propositiones Alcuini Doctoris Caroli Magni Imperatoris ad Acuendes Juvenes [Propositions of Alcuin, A Teacher of Emperor Charlemagne, for Sharpening Youths] (in Latin).
- Allott, Stephen; Alcuin of York, his life and letters ISBN 0-900657-21-9
- Atkinson, Leigh (2005). "When the Pope was a Mathematician". The College Mathematics Journal. 36 (5): 354–362. doi:10.1080/07468342.2005.11922149. ISSN 0746-8342. S2CID 121602358.
- Boswell, John (2015). Christianity, Social Tolerance, and Homosexuality - Gay People in Western Europe from the Beginning of the Christian Era to the Fourteenth Century. University of Chicago Press. ISBN 978-0-226-34536-9.
- Bromell, David (2002). "Alcuin". Who's Who in Gay and Lesbian History - From Antiquity to World War II. Psychology Press. ISBN 978-0-415-15983-8.
- Browne, G.F. (1908). Alcuin of York. London: Society for Promoting Christian Knowledge.
- Bullough, Donald A. (2004). Alcuin – Achievement and Reputation. Being Part of the Ford Lectures Delivered in Oxford in Hilary Term 1980. Brill. ISBN 978-90-04-12865-1.
- Bullough, Donald (2010) [2004]. "Alcuin (c. 740–804)". Oxford Dictionary of National Biography (online ed.). Oxford University Press. doi:10.1093/ref:odnb/298. (Subscription, Wikipedia Library access or UK public library membership required.)
- Burns, James Aloysius (1907). "Alcuin" . In Herbermann, Charles (ed.). Catholic Encyclopedia. Vol. 1. New York: Robert Appleton Company.
- Clark, David (2009). Between Medieval Men – Male Friendship and Desire in Early Medieval English Literature. Oxford: OUP. ISBN 978-0-19-156788-9.
- Colish, Marcia L. (1999). Medieval Foundations of the Western Intellectual Tradition, 400–1400. The Yale Intellectual History of the West. Yale University Press. p. 67. ISBN 9780300078527.
- Coon, Lynda L. (2011). Dark Age Bodies - Gender and Monastic Practice in the Early Medieval West. University of Pennsylvania Press. ISBN 978-0-8122-0491-9.
- Dales, Douglas J.; "Accessing Alcuin – A Master Bibliography", The Lutterworth Press, Cambridge, 2013 ISBN 978-0227901977
- Dales, Douglas (2012). Alcuin - His Life and Legacy. The Lutterworth Press. ISBN 978-0-227-17346-6.
- Dales, Douglas; Williams, Rowan (2013). "24". Alcuin - Theology and Thought. The Lutterworth Press. ISBN 978-0-227-17394-7.
- Diem, Albrecht; "The Emergence of Monastic Schools – The Role of Alcuin", in: Luuk A. J. R. Houwen and Alasdair A. McDonald (eds.), Alcuin of York – Scholar at the Carolingian Court, Groningen 1998 (Germania Latina, vol. 3), pp. 27–44.
- Duckett, Eleanor Shipley (1951). Alcuin, Friend of Charlemagne – His World and His Work. Macmillan. OCLC 1010576.
- Duckett, Eleanor Shipley; Carolingian Portraits, (1962)
- Einhard (2003) [1960]. The Life of Charlemagne. Ann Arbor paperbacks. Translated by Turner, Samuel Epes. University of Michigan Press. ISBN 978-0-472-06035-1.
- Ellsberg, Robert (2016). Blessed Among Us - Day by Day with Saintly Witnesses. Liturgical Press. ISBN 978-0-8146-4745-5.
- Frantzen, Allen J. (1998). Before the Closet - Same-Sex Love from "Beowulf" to "Angels in America". University of Chicago Press. p. 198. ISBN 978-0-226-26092-1.
- Ganshof, F.L.; The Carolingians and the Frankish Monarchy ISBN 0-582-48227-5
- Gaskoin, Charles Jacinth Bellairs (1966). Alcuin - His Life and His Work. Cambridge University Press. GGKEY:9CL47HJX2L5.
- Godman, Peter; Poetry of the Carolingian Renaissance ISBN 0-7156-1768-0
- Gorman, Michael (2002). "Alcuin before Migne". Revue Bénédictine. 112 (1–2): 101–130. doi:10.1484/J.RB.5.100616. ISSN 0035-0893.
- Hadley, John; Singmaster, David (1992). "Problems to Sharpen the Young". The Mathematical Gazette. 76 (475): 102–126. doi:10.2307/3620384. JSTOR 3620384. S2CID 125835186.
- Hutchison, Fred (1 June 2006). "A cure for the educational crisis - Learn from the extraordinary educational heritage of the West". Renew America Movement. Archived from the original on 2 June 2006.
- Jaeger, C. Stephen (1991). "L'Amour des rois – Structure sociale d'une forme de sensibilité aristocratique". Annales: Histoire, Sciences Sociales. 46 (3): 547–571. doi:10.3406/ahess.1991.278964. ISSN 0395-2649. S2CID 161706219.
- Jaeger, C. Stephen (1999). Ennobling Love: In Search of a Lost Sensibility. University of Pennsylvania Press. ISBN 0-8122-1691-1.
- Jullien, Marie-Hélène (1994). Perelman, Françoise (ed.). Clavis scriptorum Latinorum Medii Aevi - auctores Galliae, 735–987 (in Latin). Vol. Tomus II – Alcuinus. Turnhout: Brepols. OCLC 610811296.
- Liersch, Karl (1880). Die Gedichte Theodulfs, Bischofs von Orleans (in German). Halle.
- Lorenz, Frederick; The life of Alcuin, (Thomas Hurst, 1837).
- Mayr-Harting, Henry (2016). "Alcuin, Charlemagne and the problem of sanctions". In Baxter, Stephen; Karkov, Catherine; Nelson, Janet L.; Pelteret, David (eds.). Early Medieval Studies in Memory of Patrick Wormald. Routledge. ISBN 978-0754663317.
- McGuire, Brian P.; Friendship and Community – The Monastic Experience ISBN 0-87907-895-2
- Murphy, Richard E.; Alcuin of York – De Virtutibus et Vitiis, Virtues and Vices ISBN 978-0-9966967-0-8
- Needham, N. R. (2000). 2000 Years of Christ's Power. Vol. Part Two – The Middle Ages. Grace Publications Trust. ISBN 978-0-946462-56-8.
- Page, Rolph Barlow (1909). The Letters of Alcuin. New York: Forest Press.
- Stehling, Thomas; Medieval Latin Love Poems of Male Love and Friendship.
- Stella, Francesco; "Alkuins Dichtung" in Alkuin von York und die geistige Grundlegung Europas , Sankt Gallen, Verlag am Klosterhof, 2010, pp. 107–128.
- Stenton, Frank M. (2001). Anglo-Saxon England (3 ed.). Oxford University Press. ISBN 978-0192801395.
- Story, Joanna (2005). Charlemagne - Empire and Society. Manchester University Press. p. 137. ISBN 978-0719070891.
- Throop, Priscilla; trans. Alcuin – His Life; On Virtues and Vices; Dialogue with Pepin (Charlotte, VT: MedievalMS, 2011)
- Truss, Lynne (2003). Eats, Shoots and Leaves – The Zero Tolerance Approach to Punctuation. Profile Books. ISBN 978-1-86197-612-3.
- Andrew Fleming West Alcuin and the Rise of the Christian Schools (C. Scribner's Sons, 1912) ISBN 0-8371-1635-X
- Wilmot-Buxton, E. M. (1922). Alcuin. New York: P.J. Kenedy & Sons.
- Texts on Wikisource:
  - "Alcuin". Encyclopædia Britannica. Vol. 1 (11th ed.). 1911.
  - "Alcuin". Catholic Encyclopedia. Vol. 1. 1907.
  - "Alcuin". The New Student's Reference Work. Vol. 1. 1914.
  - "Alcuin or Ealhwine", A Short Biographical Dictionary of English Literature, 1910 – via Wikisource
  - "Alcuin". Dictionary of National Biography. Vol. 1. 1885.
