= Daniel Walkowitz =

American historian

Daniel J. "Danny" Walkowitz (born 1942) is an American historian who specializes in labor history, urban history, and public history. He holds a joint appointment with the Department of History and the Department of Social and Cultural Analysis at New York University. He co-founded the Archives and Public History graduate program with Paul Mattingly and served as the director of the Metropolitan Studies undergraduate program from 1989 to 2004.

According to Barbara Weinstein, NYU's History department chair, Walkowitz's well-celebrated New York City: A Social History course "has been one of the most consistently attractive offerings" by the department. It is featured as one of NYU Open Education's courses available for free streaming. Another course he offers, Walking New York, was rated by the student newspaper NYU Local as one of the "semester's best classes" across the college.

== Biography ==
Walkowitz received a B.A. in English (1964) and a Ph.D. in History (1972) from the University of Rochester, where he studied under Herbert Gutman. He taught at Rutgers–New Brunswick before coming to New York University in 1978. His wife, Judith, is a professor of British History at Johns Hopkins University.

He is affiliated with the American Historical Association, the Organization of American Historians, the National Council on Public History, and the American Studies Association.

== Documentary and filmography ==
Along with his interest in public history, Walkowitz has also contributed to several documentary and film projects, reflecting his commitment to making history to a wide audience. He directed or co-directed The Molders of Troy (1980), Public History Today (1990), and Perestroika From Below (1991). He also served as advisor on The Wobblies and The Good Fight, among others.

== Awards ==
- Mellon Fellow, University of Pennsylvania, 1978-79 (declined)
- National Endowment for the Humanities, Media Division, 1976, 1977, 1980
- National Council for Soviet and East European Research, 1989, 1990
- Stanford Humanities Center, Affiliate Fellow, 2001–02

== Selected works ==
- Haverty-Stacke, Donna T.; Walkowitz, Daniel J., eds. (2010). Rethinking U.S. Labor History: Essays on the Working-Class Experience, 1756-2009. New York, NY: Continuum International Publishing Group. ISBN 978-1441145758.
- Walkowitz, Daniel J. (2010). City Folk: English Country Dance and the Politics of the Folk in Modern America. New York, NY: New York University Press. ISBN 978-0814794692.
- Knauer, Lisa Maya; Walkowitz, Daniel J., eds. (2009). Contested Histories in Public Space: Memory, Race, and Nation. Durham, NC: Duke University Press. ISBN 978-0822342366.
- Knauer, Lisa Maya; Walkowitz, Daniel J., eds. (2004). Memory and the Impact of Political Transformation in Public Space. Durham, NC: Duke University Press. ISBN 978-0822333647.
- Walkowitz, Daniel J. (1999). Working with Class: Social Workers and the Politics of Middle-Class Identity. Chapel Hill, NC: University of North Carolina Press. ISBN 978-0807847589.
- Siegelbaum, Lewis H.; Walkowitz, Daniel J. (1995). Workers of the Donbass Speak: Survival and Identity in the New Ukraine, 1989-1992. Albany, NY: State University of New York Press. ISBN 978-0791424865.
- Frisch, Michael H.; Walkowitz, Daniel J., eds. (1982). Working-Class America: Essays on Labor, Community, and American Society. Urbana and Chicago, IL: University of Illinois Press. ISBN 978-0252009549.
- Walkowitz, Daniel J. (1978). Worker City, Company Town: Iron and Cotton-Worker Protest in Troy and Cohoes, New York, 1855-84. Urbana and Chicago, IL: University of Illinois Press. ISBN 978-0252006678.
- Stearns, Peter N.; Walkowitz, Daniel J., eds. (1974). Workers in the Industrial Revolution: Recent Studies of Labor in the United States and Europe. Piscataway, NJ: Transaction Publishers. ISBN 978-0878550814.
