= Propositiones ad Acuendos Juvenes =

9th century mathematical manuscript

The medieval Latin manuscript Propositiones ad Acuendos Juvenes (English: Problems to Sharpen the Young) is one of the earliest known collections of recreational mathematics problems. The oldest known copy of the manuscript dates from the late 9th century. The text is attributed to Alcuin of York (died 804.) Some editions of the text contain 53 problems, others 56. It has been translated into English by John Hadley, with annotations by John Hadley and David Singmaster.

The manuscript contains the first known occurrences of several types of problem, including three river-crossing problems:

- Problem 17: The jealous husbands problem. In Alcuin's version of this problem, three men, each with a sister, must cross a boat which can carry only two people, so that a woman whose brother is not present is never left in the company of another man,^{, p. 111.}
- Problem 18: The problem of the wolf, goat, and cabbage^{, p. 112.}, and
- Problem 19: Propositio de viro et muliere ponderantibus plaustrum. In this problem, a man and a woman of equal weight, together with two children, each of half their weight, wish to cross a river using a boat which can only carry the weight of one adult;^{, p. 112.}

a so-called "barrel-sharing" problem:

- Problem 12: A certain father died and left as an inheritance to his three sons 30 glass flasks, of which 10 were full of oil, another 10 were half full, while another 10 were empty. Divide the oil and flasks so that an equal share of the commodities should equally come down to the three sons, both of oil and glass;^{, p. 109.} The number of solutions to this problem for n of each type of flask are terms of Alcuin's sequence.

a variant of the jeep problem:

- Problem 52: A certain head of household ordered that 90 modia of grain be taken from one of his houses to another 30 leagues away. Given that this load of grain can be carried by a camel in three trips and that the camel eats one modius per league, how many modia were left over at the end of the journey?^{, pp. 124–125.}

and three packing problems:

- Problem 27: Proposition concerning a quadrangular city. There is a quadrangular city which has one side of 1100 feet, another side of 1000 feet, a front of 600 feet, and a final side of 600 feet. I want to put some houses there so that each house is 40 feet long and 30 feet wide. Let him say, he who wishes, How many houses ought the city to contain?
- Problem 28: Proposition concerning a triangular city. There is a triangular city which has one side of 100 feet, another side of 100 feet, and a third of 90 feet. Inside of this, I want to build a structure of houses, however, in such a way that each house is 20 feet in length, 10 feet in width. Let him say, he who can, How many houses should be contained?
- Problem 29: Proposition concerning a round city. There is a city which is 8000 feet in circumference. Let him say, he who is able, How many houses should the city contain, such that each [house] is 30 feet long, and 20 feet wide?

Some further problems are:

- Problem 5: A merchant wanted to buy 100 pigs for 100 pence. For a boar, he would pay 10 pence; for a sow, 5 pence; while he would pay 1 penny for a couple of piglets. How many boars, sows, and piglets must there have been for him to have paid exactly 100 pence for the 100 animals?

This problem dates back at least as far as 5th century China, and occurs in Indian and Arabic texts of the time.^{, p. 106.}
Problems 32, 33, 34, 38, 39, and 47 are similar, in that each divides a given quantity of money or food among a given number of people or animals consisting of three types, according to set ratios, and asks the number of each type. Algebraically, this is equivalent to two equations in three unknowns. However, since a sensible solution can only have whole people or animals, most of the problems have only one solution consisting of positive integers. In each case, Alcuin gives a solution and proves that it is correct, without describing how the solution was found.

- Problem 26: There is a field that is 150 feet long. At one end stood a dog; at the other, a hare. The dog chased the hare. Whereas the dog went 9 feet per stride, the hare went only 7. How many feet and how many leaps did the dog take in pursuing the fleeing hare until it was caught?

Overtaking problems of this type date back to 150 BC, but this is the first known European example.^{, p. 115.}

- Problem 42: There is a staircase that has 100 steps. One pigeon sat on the first step, two pigeons on the second, three on the third, four on the fourth, five on the fifth, and so on up to the hundredth step. How many pigeons were there in all?

Note that this word problem is equivalent to the arithmetic problem of adding all numbers from 1 through 100. Alcuin's solution is to note that there are 100 pigeons in total on the first and 99th steps combined, 100 more on the second and 98th combined, and so on for all the pairs of steps, except the 50th and 100th. Carl Friedrich Gauss as a pupil is presumed to have solved the equivalent arithmetic problem by pairing 1 and 100, 2 and 99, ..., 50 and 51, thus yielding 50 times 101 = 5050, a solution which is more elegant than Alcuin's solution 1000 years before.^{, p. 121.}

- Problem 43: A certain man has 300 pigs. He ordered all of them slaughtered in 3 days, but with an uneven number killed each day. What number were to be killed each day?

This problem seems to be composed for rebuking troublesome students, and no solution is given. (Three odd numbers cannot add up to 300.)^{, p. 121.}

- Problem 14: How many footprints in the last furrow does an ox make which has been plowing all day?

Another humorous problem: the answer is none, as the plow destroys them in making the furrow.

== External links and further reading ==
- (in Latin) Propositiones ad acuendos iuuenes, Latin text.
- Problems to Sharpen the Young, John Hadley and David Singmaster, The Mathematical Gazette, 76, #475 (March 1992), pp. 102–126. Annotated translation of the text into English.
- (in English and Latin) HOST: An Electronic Bulletin for the History and Philosophy of Science and Technology, 1, #2 (Spring/Summer; June 1993), ISSN 1192-084X. Contains a translation by Peter J. Burkholder of the text into English, together with introduction, commentary, and the original text.
- Rutger Kramer, "'Ecce fabula!' Problem-Solving by Numbers in the Carolingian World: The Case of the Propositiones ad Acuendos Iuvenes", http://epub.oeaw.ac.at/0xc1aa5576_0x0036d428.pdf
- Nikolai Yu. Zolotykh, Alcuin's Propositiones de Civitatibus: the Earliest Packing Problems. arXiv preprint arXiv:1308.0892 (2013)
