= Lewis Siegelbaum =

American historian, sovietologist

Lewis H. Siegelbaum
- Born: 1949 (age 76–77)

Academic background
- Education: Columbia University; University of Oxford
- Thesis: The War-Industries Committees and the politics of industrial mobilization in Russia, 1915–17 (1975)
- Doctoral advisor: Harold Shukman

Academic work
- Discipline: Modern history
- Sub-discipline: History of the Soviet Union
- Institutions: La Trobe University (1975–1983); Michigan State University (1983–2018)

Lewis H. Siegelbaum (born 1949 is an American historian and academic specializing in the history of the Soviet Union.

== Biography ==
Lewis Siegelbaum was born in New York to a secular Jewish family. According to his own account, his academic interests were influenced by the political views of his father, who had been a member of the Communist Party of the USA since 1939. As a student of Columbia University, Lewis Siegelbaum took part in protests against the Vietnam War (he later denounced the naivete of the student rebels).

He received his doctorate from the University of Oxford under the supervision of Harold Shukman in 1975 for a thesis on the history of the Central War-Industries Committee, an industrialist-dominated organization which tried to coordinate Russian industry during World War I. He taught at La Trobe University in Melbourne, Australia, from 1975, before receiving an appointment at Michigan State University in 1983. He held the Jack and Margaret Sweet Professor of History endowed chair there until his retirement in 2018.

== Books ==
- 1983: The Politics of Industrial Mobilization in Russia, 1914–1917: A Study of the War-Industries Committees (St. Martin's Press) (book review in: The American Historical Review, vol. 89, issue 5, December 1984, p. 1360, doi:10.1086/ahr/89.5.1960-a)
- 1988: Stakhanovism and the Politics of Productivity in the USSR, 1935–1941 (Cambridge University Press)
- 1992: Soviet State and Society Between Revolutions, 1918–1929 (Cambridge University Press)
- 1995: Workers of the Donbass Speak: Survival and Identity in the New Ukraine, 1989–1992 (with Daniel J. Walkowitz), SUNY Press, 1995
- 2000: Stalinism as a Way of Life: A Documentary Narrative (with Andrei Sokolov), Yale University Press
  - In his book review, Richard Pipes criticized Siegelbaum's interpretation of the presented primary sources: "He seems to have difficulty accepting the texts at their face value, and feels compelled to interpret them in sociological jargon that robs them of their force and dilutes their message."<...>"There is a reluctance in Siegelbaum's discussion to concede the totalitarian nature of the Stalinist regime."
- 2008: Cars for Comrades: The Life of the Soviet Automobile (Cornell)
  - from a prize citation: "This may well be the perfect subject for an historian of the Soviet Union who teaches in Michigan. Engagingly written with considerable wit and close attention to evidentiary detail, Cars for Comrades successfully combines technological, institutional, economic, social, and cultural history. Siegelbaum uses the automobile to shed considerable light on multiple facets of the Soviet experience, including urbanization, consumption, economic relations with the West, and the culture of everyday life. The book will enlighten and entertain specialists and students alike. "
- 2014: Broad Is My Native Land: (Note: "Broad Is My Native Land" is the literal translation of the title of the Soviet patriotic song known as "Wide is My Motherland") Repertoires and Regimes of Migration in Russia's Twentieth Century (with Leslie Page Moch)
- 2019: Stuck on Communism: Memoir of a Russian Historian (Northern Illinois University Press)
  - 2020: (Russian translation) Не расстанусь с коммунизмом. (Note: The Russian book title Не расстанусь с коммунизмом (I Will Not Part With Communism) is an allusion to the Soviet song "Не расстанусь с комсомолом, буду вечно молодым" ("I will not part with Komsomol and be eternally young")) Мемуары американского историка России, ISBN 978-1-6446935-8-2
- 2023: Making National Diasporas: Soviet Migration Regimes and Post-Soviet Consequences (Cambridge University Press, 2023) co-authored with Leslie Page Moch for the series Elements in Soviet and Post-Soviet History
- 2024: Reflections on Stalinism (Northern Illinois University Press, 2024) co-edited with J. Arch Getty

== Awards ==
- Cars for Comrades earned two prizes from the American Association for the Advancement of Slavic Studies:
  - 1989: Ed A. Hewett Book Prize
  - 1989: Honorable mention of the Reginald Zelnik Book Prize in History
- 2006: MERLOT (Multimedia Educational Resource for Learning and Online Teaching) Award for Exemplary Online Learning Resources, in History category, for the online resource "Seventeen Moments in Soviet History" (shared with James von Geldern)
- 2024: Distinguished Contributions to Slavic, East European and Eurasian Studies Award by ASEEES (Association for Slavic, East European, and Eurasian Studies)
