= Diego Luzuriaga =

Ecuadorian composer of classical music (born 1955)

Diego Luzuriaga (born 1955, in Loja) is an Ecuadorian composer of classical music.

He was awarded the Guggenheim Fellowship for Music Composition in 1993.

Luzuriaga composed Manuela y Bolívar, the first Ecuadorian opera, which relates the love and death of Manuela Sáenz and Simón Bolívar. It premiered in November 2006 at the Sucre National Theater (Teatro Nacional Sucre).

He was awarded the Eugenio Espejo National Prize in 2006. This prize is the highest recognition given to an Ecuadorian artist and it is awarded biannually by the president of Ecuador.

Andean folk and Latin American music are influences in Luzuriaga's work. His "Responsorio" has been performed by several major American symphony orchestras as part of "Caminos del Inka", a program championed by conductor Miguel Harth-Bedoya.

== Education ==
Luzuriaga earned an architecture degree from the Central University of Ecuador in Quito, before pursuing an education in musical composition at the École Normale in Paris, the Manhattan School of Music in New York, and Columbia University.
