= John Harte (scientist) =

American ecologist

John Harte (born July 8, 1939) is an American ecologist and Professor of the Graduate School in the Energy and Resources Group at the University of California at Berkeley. His work includes investigation into a maximum entropy theory of ecology and long-term experiments on the effects of climate change on alpine ecology.

== Academic career ==
Harte received his B.A. from Harvard University in 1961 and his Ph.D. in Physics from the University of Wisconsin in 1965. He was an Assistant Professor of Physics at Yale University from 1968 to 1973. He used his analytic abilities in 1971 to assess the impact of a proposed jetport on the Florida Everglades, the findings of which were instrumental in the rejection of the proposal. Impressed by the impact science could have on policy and conservation, he transitioned into the study of theoretical ecology, and joined the UC Berkeley faculty as an ecologist in the Energy and Resources Group in 1973.

== Research and policy work ==
In 1990, Harte started the Warming Meadow experiment, the first realistically simulated global warming field experiment, using overhead radiant heaters. The project has involved many scientists, and continued for nearly 30 years, making it the longest-running global warming field experiment ever undertaken. Located at an elevation of 9,560 feet rise in the Upper East River Valley near the Gothic, Colorado townsite, Warming Meadow was used to study the impact of increased temperatures and earlier snowmelt on the area's subalpine meadows. The project used a linear array of 10 experimental plots that alternated between unheated (control) and heated plots, where the soil and vegetation of the latter were continually heated by an average of 2 degrees Celsius, the temperature change predicted at that time for global warming.

This controlled setup has demonstrated how, over decades, the increased heating of Earth's atmosphere would affect an ecosystem—in this case, a common subalpine meadow. The experiment offered insights into how global warming would significantly affect other ecosystems. The research results on heating a subalpine meadow ecosystem were reported in over 30 published scientific papers, and a dozen doctoral dissertations throughout the decades. The research was also described popularly, such as on Now with Bill Moyers, and in Mother Jones Magazine.

Harte found that spring snowmelt occurred 2–3 weeks earlier in the heated plots. Heated subalpine meadow plots were greatly impacted and started transforming from non-woody flowering plants (forbs) towards more arid sagebrush habitat. Major findings included showing that this resulted in a loss of 25% of the soil carbon, in the form of climate-warming gases, into the atmosphere. This created a feedback loop that increased global warming.

By 2015, published research showed that unheated meadow plots were showing the same effects as heated plots but more slowly—that is, unheated plots were tracking the actual effects of climate change in real time. These results affirmed the realism of the experimental manipulation (ie, heating plots).

Harte has spoken out on the policy implications of his global warming research to the public on numerous occasions, notably in a filmed 2022 presentation to the Central Colorado Humanists. With his wife, Mary Ellen (Mel) Harte, he co-authored the first free online book on climate change and policy in 2009, Cool the Earth, Save the Economy: Solving the Climate Crisis Is EASY.

Harte has also published (e.g.,) on the problem of, and needed solutions to, the unsustainable global growth of human populations.

== Honors and awards ==
He was selected in July 1990 to be one of the first recipients of the Pew Scholar Prize in Conservation and the Environment.

He received a Guggenheim Fellowship in 1993 and the Leo Szilard prize from the American Physical Society in 2001.

Further honors include the Phi Beta Kappa Lectureship, the University of Colorado Distinguished Lectureship, the UC Berkeley Graduate Mentorship Award, a Miller Professorship, and a George Polk Award in investigative journalism.

He was elected Fellow to the:

- American Physical Society in 1988 "for contributions to the interface between physics and ecology, including development of understanding of climate codification due to nuclear winter and to the impact of acid rain on aquatic ecosystems";
- California Academy of Sciences;
- American Association for the Advancement of Science (AAAS) in 2014;
- Ecological Society of America in 2019 "for foundational leadership on early work on climate change and education of the ecological crisis to come, for pioneering work on feedbacks and synergies among global change drivers, and for development of the maximum entropy theory of ecology."

== Selected publications ==
- Harte, J. and M. E. Harte. 2008. Cool the Earth, Save the Economy: Solving Global Warming is EASY, an online book available for free download.
- Harte, J. and R. Socolow. 1971. Patient Earth. Holt, Rinehart, and Winston, New York. ISBN 978-0030865718
- Harte, John. 1988. Consider a Spherical Cow: A Course in Environmental Problem Solving. University Science Books, Sausalito, California. ISBN 978-0-935702-58-3
- Harte, John. 2011. Maximum Entropy and Ecology: A Theory of Abundance, Distribution, and Energetics. Oxford Series in Ecology and Evolution. ISBN 978-0199593422
- Harte, John. 1996. The Green Fuse: An Ecological Odyssey. University of California Press. ISBN 978-0520205512
- Harte, John. 1991. Toxics A to Z: A Guide to Everyday Pollution Hazards. University of California Press. ISBN 978-0520072244
- D. Jensen, M. Torn, and J. Harte. 1993. In Our Own Hands: A Strategy for Conserving Biodiversity in California. University of California. Press. ISBN 9780520080157
- Harte, John. 2001. Consider a Cylindrical Cow: More Adventures in Environmental Problem Solving. University Science Books. ISBN 978-1891389177

== See also ==
- Entropy and life
- List of Guggenheim Fellowships awarded in 1993
