= Gloria Ferrari Pinney =

Italian at historian

- Born: June 2, 1941; Bologna
- Died: September 18, 2023 (aged 82)
- Occupation: Art historian

Gloria Ferrari Pinney (June 2, 1941 – September 18, 2023) was an Italian-born art historian and college professor. She was a Guggenheim Fellow, a Fulbright Scholar, and a professor at Harvard University, Bryn Mawr College, the University of Chicago, and Wilson College in Pennsylvania.

== Early life and education ==
Ferrari was born in Bologna. She earned her Laurea at the Sapienza University of Rome, and completed doctoral work at the University of Cincinnati in 1976. Her dissertation was titled "Prolegomena to a Study of Archaic Attic Red-Figure" (1976), completed under advisor Cedric G. Boulter.

== Career ==
Pinney was a professor at Wilson College beginning in 1976, at Bryn Mawr College from 1990 to 1993, at the University of Chicago from 1993 to 1998, and at Harvard University from 1998 until she retired in 2003. She organized exhibitions at museums including the Smart Museum of Art at the University of Chicago and the Allentown Art Museum. She was described in a 2012 review by Aaron Tugendhaft as "a powerful voice championing the linguistic approach to Greek iconography." A festschrift was assembled to mark her 80th birthday in 2021.

Pinney held a Fulbright scholarship from 1965 to 1966, to participate in archaeological excavations in Italy. She won a Guggenheim Fellowship in 1993. In 2001, she received a fellowship from the Center for Advanced Study in the Behavioral Sciences at Stanford University. She was elected to the American Philosophical Society in 2003. In 2004, she won the Wiseman Book Award from the Archaeological Institute of America. She also held fellowships and other awards from the American Academy in Rome, the National Humanities Center, the National Endowment for the Humanities, and the National Gallery of Art's Center for Advanced Study in the Visual Arts.

== Publications ==
Pinney's research was published in academic journals including The Journal of Hellenic Studies, American Journal of Archaeology, Harvard Studies in Classical Philology, Metis, Revue Archéologique, Metropolitan Museum Journal, and Classical Antiquity. She was on the editorial advisory board of the journal Hesperia.

- Il commercio dei sarcofagi asiatici (1966)
- "The Nonage of the Berlin Painter" (1981)
- "Herakles at the Ends of the Earth" (1981, with Brunilde Sismondo Ridgway)
- "Achilles Lord of Scythia" (1983)
- "Money-Bags" (1986)
- "Eye-Cup" (1986)
- Materiali del Museo Archeologico di Tarquinia XI: I vasi attici a figure rosse del periodo arcaico (1988)
- "Felicior Augusto: Limes Phalerae and the Ravenna Relief" (1989)
- "Héraclès, Pisistratus and the Panathenaea" (1994)
- "Fugitive Nudes: The Woman Athlete" (1995)
- "The End of Aponia" (1995)
- "Meaningful Figures" (1996)
- ""Figures in the Text: Metaphors and Riddles in the Agamemnon" (1997)
- "The Ilioupersis in Athens" (2000)
- ""The Ancient Temple on the Acropolis at Athens" (2002)
- Figures of Speech: Men and Maidens in Ancient Greece (2002)
- "Myth and Genre on Athenian Vases" (2003)
- "What kind of rite of passage was the Ancient Greek wedding?" (2003)
- "Architectural Space as Metaphor in the Greek Sanctuary" (2006)
- Alcman and the Cosmos of Sparta (2008)

== Personal life ==
Ferrari married Kentucky architect Paul Martin Pinney Jr. in 1966. They had a daughter, Antonia, and later divorced. Her ex-husband was killed in 1997. Ferrari had two grandchildren, Alex and Leo Cuadra, the sons of her daughter, Dr. Antonia Pinney, a physician. Gloria Ferrari died in 2023, at the age of 82.
