= Elliott Green =

- Born: 1960 (age 65–66); Detroit, Michigan
- Occupation: Artist
- Website: https://www.elliottgreen.com/

Elliott Green is an artist who paints abstract and gesturally expressive landscape works that depict surreal geographic terrains. He is based in upstate New York. He was a recipient of the Guggenheim Foundation Fellowship in 1993 and the Rome Prize in 2011. His work has been featured in magazines such as Hyperallergic and Artforum.

== Biography ==
Green was born in Detroit, Michigan in 1960 and studied literature and art history at the University of Michigan from 1978 to 1981. He moved to New York in 1981 and had his first solo shows in 1989 and 1991. In 2005 he moved to Athens, New York, where he currently works and lives. Green primarily exhibits his work in New York, but has exhibited in other U.S. states including Florida and California.

== Career ==
=== Early work ===
Green's early work consists of figural drawings, prints, and paintings that depict crowds of people in a cartoon-like style, often in a humorous or subversive manner. Green has stated that he feels his early work was very influenced by his environment and that while he was working in his Tribeca studio his drawings echoed the dense population around him.

=== Landscape paintings ===
Green first began painting landscape after being inspired by the vast panoramic landscapes while living in Italy in 2012. Critics have described his landscapes for their essentially abstract nature, where forms of mountains, clouds, water, and land are present yet never fully legible. His work has also been described as otherworldly, sci-fi, and as having a digital yet highly tactile appearance that comes from his creative use of sponges and palette knives while applying gradients of colors. His paintings have an expressive, gestural style and cohesive vocabulary of abstract shapes that reference geological formations and seem to blend the internal psychological states with the external world. His work shows the influences of Surrealism, traditional Chinese landscape painting, and Abstract Expressionism.

== Awards and fellowships ==
- BAU Institute, Cassis, France, 2017
- Yaddo Residency, Saratoga Springs, NY, 2016
- Rome Prize, Rome, Italy, 2011–12
- Guggenheim Fellowship, 1993

== Collections ==
Green's work is held in the permanent collection of the Museum of Contemporary Art, Chicago, the Kemper Museum of Contemporary Art, the University of Colorado Fine Arts Galleries, and other venues.
