= Gayle Pemberton =

American essayist (born 1948)

- Born: June 29, 1948 (age 78); St. Paul, Minnesota, U.S.
- Occupation: Essayist
- Awards: Guggenheim Fellow (1993)

Academic background
- Education: Lake Forest College; University of Michigan; Harvard University; Wesleyan University
- Thesis: To find a place for becoming: the influence of the Left in black writing (1981)

Gayle Pemberton (born June 29, 1948) is an American essayist. She won the 1993 New Jersey Humanities Book Award for her essay series The Hottest Water in Chicago. She also worked as a professor at Northwestern University, Bowdoin College, Princeton University, and Wesleyan University (where she was a William R. Kenan Jr. Professor), and she was a 1993 Guggenheim Fellow.

== Biography ==
Gayle Pemberton was born June 29, 1948, in St. Paul, Minnesota, to a family "with educated, middle-class leanings but not middle-class money". The younger of two daughters, her parents were Muriel E. (née Wigington) and Lounneer Pemberton, who worked for the National Urban League. She attended Central High School in Kansas City, Missouri, graduating in 1965, and Bradford Girls' Grammar School, where she was an American Field Service exchange student.

Pemberton briefly attended Lake Forest College, before going to the University of Michigan, where she got a BA in English in 1969, and Harvard University, where she got her MA in English in 1971 and PhD in American literature and Language in 1981; her doctoral dissertation was titled To find a place for becoming: the influence of the Left in black writing. As part of her doctoral studies, she was a 1974-1975 Ford Foundation fellow and 1975-1976 W. E. B. Du Bois Foundation Fellow. She also held a Master of Arts Administration degree from Wesleyan University.

After working as a lecturer at Columbia University (1974-1977) and as an instructor in Middlebury College (1977-1980), Pemberton became an assistant professor of English at Northwestern University, serving until 1983. Following a brief stint as visiting associate professor of English at Reed College (1983-1984), she became acting director for minority affairs at Bowdoin College in 1986, before being promoted to a full-time basis in 1988. In 1990, she left Bowdoin to become Princeton University's associate director for African-American studies, serving until 1993.

Pemberton was author of On Teaching the Minority Student (1988). In 1992, she published The Hottest Water in Chicago, a sixteen-essay series which Nancy Mairs called "part memoir, part social analysis, part literary criticism"; she won the 1993 New Jersey Humanities Book Award for that book. She was a contributor to Race-ing Justice, En-gendering Power. In 1993, she was awarded a Guggenheim Fellowship to research Black women in American film.

In 1994, Pemberton became a full professor of English at Wesleyan and was appointed William R. Kenan Jr. Professor, eventually becoming professor emeritus. She was a visiting professor at Mount Holyoke College from 2008 to 2015.

== Bibliography ==
- On Teaching the Minority Student (1988)
- The Hottest Water in Chicago (1992)
