= Barbara A. Baird =

American cell biologist and biophysicist (born 1951)

Barbara Ann Baird (born 1951) is an American cell biologist and biophysicist. Baird's research investigates receptor-mediated cell signaling, including how cellular membranes are involved in targeting/regulating signaling pathways.

== Education and career ==
Baird completed a bachelor's of science degree in chemistry at Knox College, graduating in 1973. She obtained a doctorate in the subject at Cornell University, where she later held the Horace White Professorship. She was a Damon Runyon Postdoctoral Fellow at the National Cancer Institute.

== Honors ==
Baird was awarded a Guggenheim fellowship in 1993, and was honored as one of the IUPAC 2021 Distinguished Women in Chemistry or Chemical Engineering. She is a fellow of the American Association for the Advancement of Science (2006) and American Academy of Arts and Sciences (2008).
