= Judith R. Walkowitz =

American historian (born 1945)

- Born: 1945; New York, New York
- Education: PhD, University of Rochester
- Known for: Historian of Great Britain

Judith Rosenberg Walkowitz (born 13 Sep 1945) is an American author and a professor of history and women's studies at Johns Hopkins University. Her research and publications center on modern European political and social culture, with a particular focus on feminism and sexuality within British culture in the 19th-century. In 1993, she was awarded a Guggenheim Fellowship in the field of British History.

== Selected Publications ==
- Prostitution and Victorian Society (1980)
- City of Dreadful Delight (1992)
- Nights Out: Life in Cosmopolitan London (2012)
