= Allen Frantzen =

American medievalist

Allen J. Frantzen (born 1947) is an American medievalist with a specialization in Old English literature. Since retiring from Loyola University Chicago, he has been an emeritus professor.

== Education and career ==
Frantzen grew up in rural Iowa and earned a degree in English from Loras College and a PhD from the University of Virginia with a dissertation on the literature of penance in the Anglo-Saxon period. He was a faculty member at Loyola University Chicago from 1978 until his retirement in 2014, when he was named an emeritus professor. While there he headed the graduate programs in English from 1984 to 1988 and in 1992 founded the Loyola Community Literacy Center, which is open to the community as well as to students at the university.

== Publications ==
Frantzen has published introductory works intended for students, such as King Alfred (1986) and 'Troilus and Criseyde': The Poem and the Frame (1993) on Chaucer's Troilus and Criseyde. He also co-edited The Work of Work. Servitude, Slavery, and Labor in Medieval England (1994) with Douglas Moffat.

His first book was on the subject-matter of his dissertation, The Literature of Penance in Anglo-Saxon England (1983); he returned to the Anglo-Saxon penitential literature in Before the Closet: Same-Sex Love from 'Beowulf' to 'Angels in America' (1998), in which, himself a gay man, he argues that contrary to John Boswell's argument, same-sex relations were not tolerated more by the Church before the Norman Conquest, but rather the relationships were not "closeted"; he takes what he calls a "legitimist" rather than a "liberationist" view of the textual evidence. The book has been described as "groundbreaking".

Frantzen has also published critiques of the field of Old English studies: Desire for Origins: New Language, Old English, and Teaching the Tradition (1990), a study of the history of the field, and Speaking Two Languages: Traditional Disciplines and Contemporary Theory in Medieval Studies (1991). The former, in which Frantzen argues that Anglo-Saxon studies are increasingly regarded as hidebound because of the insular approach within the field, attracted much notice. Fred C. Robinson wrote that it "should be read by all medievalists who care about their profession." In 1994 Frantzen was the keynote speaker at a conference at the University of California, Berkeley that was published as Anglo-Saxonism and the Construction of Social Identity (1997).

In Bloody Good: Chivalry, Sacrifice, and the Great War (2004) he studied the mythology of chivalry and of imitatio Christi as motivations for participants in World War I.

After his retirement, Frantzen wrote a blog post dated September 2015 titled "How to Fight Your Way Out of the Feminist Fog" in which he aligned himself with the men's rights movement against what he argued were the anti-man demands of feminists; this provoked disapproving responses from certain medievalists after it was publicized in early 2016.

== Honors ==
- Guggenheim Fellowship, 1993
- Loyola University Faculty Member of the Year 1991, Master Teacher (College of Arts & Sciences) 1997–98, Faculty Scholar 2000.
- Teaching Excellence Award of the Medieval Academy of America, 2013
- Opera Omnia: A Festspiel for Allen J. Frantzen: celebratory conference organized by former students, 2015.
