= List of complex analysis topics =

Complex analysis, traditionally known as the theory of functions of a complex variable, is the branch of mathematics that investigates functions of complex numbers. It is useful in many branches of mathematics, including number theory and applied mathematics; as well as in physics, including hydrodynamics, thermodynamics, and electrical engineering.

See also: glossary of real and complex analysis.

== Overview ==
- Complex numbers
- Complex plane
- Complex functions
  - Complex derivative
  - Holomorphic functions
  - Harmonic functions
- Elementary functions
  - Polynomial functions
  - Exponential functions
  - Trigonometric functions
  - Hyperbolic functions
  - Logarithmic functions
  - Inverse trigonometric functions
  - Inverse hyperbolic functions
- Residue theory
- Isometries in the complex plane

== Related fields ==
- Number theory
- Hydrodynamics
- Thermodynamics
- Electrical engineering

== Local theory ==
- Holomorphic function
- Antiholomorphic function
- Cauchy–Riemann equations
- Conformal mapping
  - Conformal welding
- Power series
- Radius of convergence
- Laurent series
- Meromorphic function
- Entire function
- Pole (complex analysis)
- Zero (complex analysis)
- Residue (complex analysis)
- Isolated singularity
- Removable singularity
- Essential singularity
- Branch point
- Principal branch
- Weierstrass–Casorati theorem
- Landau's constants
- Holomorphic functions are analytic
- Schwarzian derivative
- Analytic capacity
- Disk algebra
- Univalent function

== Growth and distribution of values ==
- Ahlfors theory
- Bieberbach conjecture
- Borel–Carathéodory theorem
- Corona theorem
- Hadamard three-circle theorem
- Hardy space
- Hardy's theorem
- Maximum modulus principle
- Nevanlinna theory
- Paley–Wiener theorem
- Phragmén-Lindelöf principle
- Progressive function
- Value distribution theory of holomorphic functions

== Contour integrals ==
- Line integral
- Cauchy's integral theorem
- Cauchy's integral formula
- Residue theorem
- Liouville's theorem (complex analysis)
- Examples of contour integration
- Fundamental theorem of algebra
- Simply connected
- Winding number
  - Principle of the argument
  - Rouché's theorem
- Bromwich integral
- Morera's theorem
- Mellin transform
- Kramers–Kronig relation, a. k. a. Hilbert transform
- Sokhotski–Plemelj theorem

== Special functions ==
- Exponential function
- Beta function
- Gamma function
- Riemann zeta function
  - Riemann hypothesis
  - Generalized Riemann hypothesis
- Elliptic function
  - Half-period ratio
  - Jacobi's elliptic functions
  - Weierstrass's elliptic functions
  - Theta function
- Elliptic modular function
- J-function
- Modular function
- Modular form

== Riemann surfaces ==
- Analytic continuation
- Riemann sphere
- Riemann surface
- Riemann mapping theorem
- Carathéodory's theorem (conformal mapping)
- Riemann–Roch theorem

== Other ==
- Amplitwist
- Antiderivative (complex analysis)
- Bôcher's theorem
- Cayley transform
- Harmonic conjugate
- Hilbert's inequality
- Method of steepest descent
- Montel's theorem
- Periodic points of complex quadratic mappings
- Pick matrix
- Runge approximation theorem
- Schwarz lemma
- Weierstrass factorization theorem
- Mittag-Leffler's theorem
- Sendov's conjecture
- Infinite compositions of analytic functions

== Several complex variables ==
- Biholomorphy
- Cartan's theorems A and B
- Cousin problems
- Edge-of-the-wedge theorem
- Several complex variables

== People ==
- Augustin Louis Cauchy
- Leonhard Euler
- Carl Friedrich Gauss
- Jacques Hadamard
- Kiyoshi Oka
- Bernhard Riemann
- Karl Weierstrass
- Pierre Alphonse Laurent
- Brook Taylor
- Siméon Denis Poisson
- Hermann Schwarz
- Camille Jordan
- Carl Gustav Jacob Jacobi
- Eugène Rouché
- Gerardus Mercator
- Joseph Liouville
- Pierre-Simon Laplace
- August Ferdinand Möbius
- William Kingdon Clifford
