= Morera's theorem =

Integral criterion for holomorphy

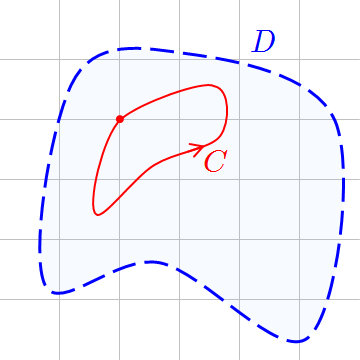
If the integral along every C is zero, then f is holomorphic on D.

In complex analysis, a branch of mathematics, Morera's theorem, named after Giacinto Morera, gives a criterion for proving that a function is holomorphic.

Morera's theorem states that a continuous, complex-valued function f defined on an open set D in the complex plane that satisfies
$$\oint_\gamma f(z)\,dz = 0$$
for every closed piecewise C^{1} curve $\gamma$ in D must be holomorphic on D.

The assumption of Morera's theorem is equivalent to f having an antiderivative on D.

The converse of the theorem is not true in general. A holomorphic function need not possess an antiderivative on its domain, unless one imposes additional assumptions. The converse does hold e.g. if the domain is simply connected; this is Cauchy's integral theorem, stating that the line integral of a holomorphic function along a closed curve is zero.

The standard "counterexample" is the function f(z) = 1/z, which is holomorphic on C − {0}. On any simply connected neighborhood U in C − {0}, 1/z has an antiderivative defined by L(z) = ln(r) + iθ, where z = re^{iθ}. Because of the ambiguity of θ up to the addition of any integer multiple of 2π, any continuous choice of θ on U will suffice to define an antiderivative of 1/z on U. (It is the fact that θ cannot be defined continuously on a simple closed curve containing the origin in its interior that is the root of why 1/z has no antiderivative on its entire domain C − {0}.) And because the derivative of an additive constant is 0, any constant may be added to the antiderivative and the result will still be an antiderivative of 1/z.

== Proof ==
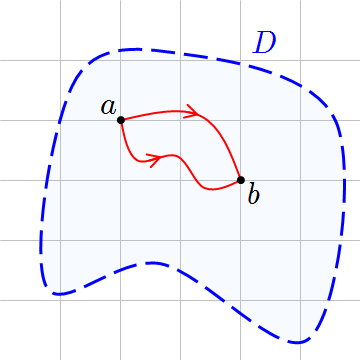
The integrals along two paths from a to b are equal, since their difference is the integral along a closed loop.

To prove the theorem, we construct an anti-derivative for f. Since the anti-derivative is holomorphic (by construction!), and since holomorphic functions are analytic, it follows that f is holomorphic.

Without loss of generality, it can be assumed that D is connected. Fix a point z_{0} in D, and for any $z\in D$, let $\gamma: [0,1]\to D$ be a piecewise C^{1} curve such that $\gamma(0)=z_0$ and $\gamma(1)=z$. Then define the function F to be
$$F(z) = \int_\gamma f(\zeta)\,d\zeta.$$

To see that the function is well-defined, suppose $\tau: [0,1]\to D$ is another piecewise C^{1} curve such that $\tau(0)=z_0$ and $\tau(1)=z$. The curve $\gamma \tau^{-1}$ (i.e. the curve combining $\gamma$ with $\tau$ in reverse) is a closed piecewise C^{1} curve in D. Then,
$$\int_{\gamma} f(\zeta)\,d\zeta + \int_{\tau^{-1}} f(\zeta) \, d\zeta =\oint_{\gamma \tau^{-1}} f(\zeta)\,d\zeta = 0.$$

And it follows that
$$\int_\gamma f(\zeta)\,d\zeta = \int_\tau f(\zeta)\,d\zeta.$$

Then using the continuity of f to estimate difference quotients, we get that F′(z) = f(z). Had we chosen a different z_{0} in D, F would change by a constant: namely, the result of integrating f along any piecewise regular curve between the new z_{0} and the old, and this does not change the derivative.

== Applications ==
Morera's theorem is a standard tool in complex analysis. It is used in almost any argument that involves a non-algebraic construction of a holomorphic function.

=== Uniform limits ===
For example, suppose that f_{1}, f_{2}, ... is a sequence of holomorphic functions, converging uniformly to a continuous function f on an open disc. By Cauchy's theorem, we know that
$$\oint_C f_n(z)\,dz = 0$$
for every n, along any closed curve C in the disc. Then the uniform convergence implies that
$$\oint_C f(z)\,dz = \oint_C \lim_{n\to \infty} f_n(z)\,dz =\lim_{n\to \infty} \oint_C f_n(z)\,dz = 0$$
for every closed curve C, and therefore by Morera's theorem f must be holomorphic. This fact can be used to show that, for any open set Ω ⊆ C, the set A(Ω) of all bounded, analytic functions u : Ω → C is a Banach space with respect to the supremum norm.

=== Infinite sums and integrals ===
Morera's theorem can also be used in conjunction with Fubini's theorem and the Weierstrass M-test to show the analyticity of functions defined by sums or integrals, such as the Riemann zeta function
$$\zeta(s) = \sum_{n=1}^\infty \frac{1}{n^s}$$
or the Gamma function
$$\Gamma(\alpha) = \int_0^\infty x^{\alpha-1} e^{-x}\,dx.$$

Specifically one shows that
$$\oint_C \Gamma(\alpha)\,d\alpha = 0$$
for a suitable closed curve C, by writing
$$\oint_C \Gamma(\alpha)\,d\alpha = \oint_C \int_0^\infty x^{\alpha-1} e^{-x} \, dx \,d\alpha$$
and then using Fubini's theorem to justify changing the order of integration, getting
$$\int_0^\infty \oint_C x^{\alpha-1} e^{-x} \,d\alpha \,dx = \int_0^\infty e^{-x} \oint_C x^{\alpha-1} \, d\alpha \,dx.$$

Then one uses the analyticity of α ↦ x^{α−1} to conclude that
$$\oint_C x^{\alpha-1} \, d\alpha = 0,$$
and hence the double integral above is 0. Similarly, in the case of the zeta function, the M-test justifies interchanging the integral along the closed curve and the sum.

== Weakening of hypotheses ==
The hypotheses of Morera's theorem can be weakened considerably. In particular, it suffices for the integral
$$\oint_{\partial T} f(z)\, dz$$
to be zero for every closed (solid) triangle T contained in the region D. This in fact characterizes holomorphy, i.e. f is holomorphic on D if and only if the above conditions hold. It also implies the following generalisation of the aforementioned fact about uniform limits of holomorphic functions: if f_{1}, f_{2}, ... is a sequence of holomorphic functions defined on an open set Ω ⊆ C that converges to a function f uniformly on compact subsets of Ω, then f is holomorphic.

== See also ==
- Cauchy–Riemann equations
- Methods of contour integration
- Residue (complex analysis)
- Mittag-Leffler's theorem
