= Wirtinger derivatives =

Concept in complex analysis

In complex analysis of one and several complex variables, Wirtinger derivatives (sometimes also called Wirtinger operators), named after Wilhelm Wirtinger who introduced them in 1927 in the course of his studies on the theory of functions of several complex variables, are partial differential operators of the first order which behave in a very similar manner to the ordinary derivatives with respect to one real variable, when applied to holomorphic functions, antiholomorphic functions or simply differentiable functions on complex domains. These operators permit the construction of a differential calculus for such functions that is entirely analogous to the ordinary differential calculus for functions of real variables.

== Historical notes ==
=== Early days (1899–1911): the work of Henri Poincaré ===
Wirtinger derivatives were used in complex analysis at least as early as in the paper (Poincaré 1899), as briefly noted by Cherry & Ye (2001, p. 31) and by Remmert (1991, pp. 66–67). In the third paragraph of his 1899 paper, Henri Poincaré first defines the complex variable in $\Complex^n$ and its complex conjugate as follows

$$\begin{cases}
x_k+iy_k=z_k\\
x_k-iy_k=u_k
\end{cases} \qquad 1 \leqslant k \leqslant n.$$

Then he writes the equation defining the functions $V$ he calls biharmonique, previously written using partial derivatives with respect to the real variables $x_k, y_q$ with $k, q$ ranging from 1 to $n$, exactly in the following way

$$\frac{d^2 V}{dz_k \, du_q}=0$$

This implies that he implicitly used definition 2 below: to see this it is sufficient to compare equations 2 and 2' of (Poincaré 1899, p. 112). Apparently, this paper was not noticed by early researchers in the theory of functions of several complex variables: in the papers of Levi-Civita (1905), Levi (1910) (and Levi 1911) and of Amoroso (1912) all fundamental partial differential operators of the theory are expressed directly by using partial derivatives respect to the real and imaginary parts of the complex variables involved. In the long survey paper by Osgood (1966) (first published in 1913), partial derivatives with respect to each complex variable of a holomorphic function of several complex variables seem to be meant as formal derivatives: as a matter of fact when Osgood expresses the pluriharmonic operator and the Levi operator, he follows the established practice of Amoroso, Levi and Levi-Civita.

=== The work of Dimitrie Pompeiu in 1912 and 1913: a new formulation ===
According to Henrici (1993, p. 294), a new step in the definition of the concept was taken by Dimitrie Pompeiu: in the paper (Pompeiu 1912), given a complex valued differentiable function (in the sense of real analysis) of one complex variable $g(z)$ defined in the neighbourhood of a given point $z_0 \in \Complex,$ he defines the areolar derivative as the following limit

$${\frac{\partial g}{\partial \bar{z}}(z_0)}\mathrel{\overset{\mathrm{def}}{=}}\lim_{r \to 0}\frac{1}{2\pi i r^2} \oint_{\Gamma(z_0,r)} g(z)\mathrm{d}z,$$

where $\Gamma(z_0,r)=\partial D(z_0,r)$ is the boundary of a disk of radius $r$ entirely contained in the domain of definition of $g(z),$ i.e. his bounding circle. This is evidently an alternative definition of Wirtinger derivative respect to the complex conjugate variable: it is a more general one, since, as noted a by Henrici (1993, p. 294), the limit may exist for functions that are not even differentiable at $z=z_0.$ According to Fichera (1969, p. 28), the first to identify the areolar derivative as a weak derivative in the sense of Sobolev was Ilia Vekua. In his following paper, Pompeiu (1913) uses this newly defined concept in order to introduce his generalization of Cauchy's integral formula, the now called Cauchy–Pompeiu formula.

=== The work of Wilhelm Wirtinger ===
The first systematic introduction of Wirtinger derivatives seems due to Wilhelm Wirtinger in the paper Wirtinger 1927 in order to simplify the calculations of quantities occurring in the theory of functions of several complex variables: as a result of the introduction of these differential operators, the form of all the differential operators commonly used in the theory, like the Levi operator and the Cauchy–Riemann operator, is considerably simplified and consequently easier to handle. The paper is deliberately written from a formal point of view, i.e. without giving a rigorous derivation of the properties deduced.

== Heuristic explanation ==
All complex functions differentiable on the complex plane have a uniquely defined derivative. This can be stated as:

If

$$\begin{align}
\delta{f(z,\bar z)} &\equiv\frac {\partial f}{\partial z}\delta z+\frac{\partial f}{\partial \bar z}\delta \bar z=\left[\left(\frac{\partial}{\partial z}+\frac{\partial}{\partial \bar z}\right)f\right]\delta x+\left[i\left(\frac{\partial}{\partial \bar z}+\frac{\partial}{\partial z}\right)f\right]\delta y\\
\delta f(x,y) &= \frac{\partial f}{\partial x}\delta x+\frac{\partial f}{\partial y}\delta y\implies\frac{\partial f}{\partial z} (z,\bar z)= \frac{1}{2} \left( \frac{\partial}{\partial x} - i \frac{\partial}{\partial y} \right)f(x,y), \quad \frac{\partial f}{\partial\bar{z}} (z,\bar z)= \frac{1}{2} \left( \frac{\partial}{\partial x} + i \frac{\partial}{\partial y} \right)f(x,y)
\end{align}$$

given that
$$f(x,y)$$
is real differentiable function. If there exists a constraint between $z = x + iy,\quad \bar z= z^*=x-iy$ i.e. $\lambda_1\delta z+\lambda_2\delta \bar z=0$ for some arbitrary coefficients, it no longer follows that $\frac{\partial f}{\partial z},\frac{\partial f}{\partial \bar z}$ can be uniquely identified and the two lines are related modulo constraint equations through a Lagrange multiplier. However, uniqueness is guaranteed by non existence of such constraint equations:
$$\lambda_z\delta z+\lambda_{\bar z}\delta \bar z=(\lambda_z+\lambda_{\bar z})\delta x+i(\lambda_{\bar z}-\lambda_z)\delta y=0\implies(\lambda_z+\lambda_{\bar z})=0=i(\lambda_{\bar z}-\lambda_z),\implies \lambda_{\bar z}=0=\lambda_z.$$

== Formal definitions ==
Despite their ubiquitous use, it seems that there is no text listing all the properties of Wirtinger derivatives: however, fairly complete references are the short course on multidimensional complex analysis by Andreotti (1976, pp. 3–5), the monograph of Gunning & Rossi (1965, pp. 3–6), and the monograph of Kaup & Kaup (1983, p. 2,4) which are used as general references in this and the following sections.

=== Derivative of complex functions ===
Definition 1. Consider the complex plane $\Complex \equiv \R^2 = \{(x,y) \mid x, y \in \R \}$ (in a sense of expressing a complex number $z = x + iy$ for real numbers $x$ and $y$). Let $\bar{z}$ represent the complex conjugate of $z \ .$ Then the Wirtinger derivatives are defined as the following linear partial differential operators of first order:

$$\begin{align}
\frac{\partial}{\partial z} &= \frac{1}{2} \left( \frac{\partial}{\partial x} - i \frac{\partial}{\partial y} \right) \\ \frac{\partial}{\partial\bar{z}} &= \frac{1}{2} \left( \frac{\partial}{\partial x} + i \frac{\partial}{\partial y} \right)
\end{align}$$

Clearly, the natural domain of definition of these partial differential operators is the space of $C^1$ functions on a domain $\Omega \subseteq \R^2,$ but, since these operators are linear and have constant coefficients, they can be readily extended to every space of generalized functions

The operators can be derived by noting that $x = \frac{1}{2} (z + \bar{z}), y = \frac{1}{2i} (z - \bar{z})$, and taking the derivative with respect to $\bar{z}$ using the multivariable chain rule, treating $x, y$ as intermediate variables.

==== Functions of n > 1 complex variables ====
Definition 2. Consider the Euclidean space on the complex field
$$\Complex^n = \R^{2n} = \left\{\left( \mathbf{x}, \mathbf{y} \right) = \left(x_1,\ldots,x_n, y_1, \ldots, y_n\right) \mid \mathbf{x},\mathbf{y} \in \R^n \right\}.$$
The Wirtinger derivatives are defined as the following linear partial differential operators of first order:
$$\begin{cases}
\frac{\partial}{\partial z_1} = \frac{1}{2} \left( \frac{\partial}{\partial x_1}- i \frac{\partial}{\partial y_1} \right) \\
\qquad \vdots \\
\frac{\partial}{\partial z_n} = \frac{1}{2} \left( \frac{\partial}{\partial x_n}- i \frac{\partial}{\partial y_n} \right) \\
\end{cases}, \qquad
\begin{cases}
\frac{\partial}{\partial\bar{z}_1} = \frac{1}{2} \left( \frac{\partial}{\partial x_1}+ i \frac{\partial}{\partial y_1} \right) \\
\qquad \vdots \\
\frac{\partial}{\partial\bar{z}_n} = \frac{1}{2} \left( \frac{\partial}{\partial x_n}+ i \frac{\partial}{\partial y_n} \right) \\
\end{cases}.$$

As for Wirtinger derivatives for functions of one complex variable, the natural domain of definition of these partial differential operators is again the space of $C^1$ functions on a domain $\Omega \subset \R^{2n},$ and again, since these operators are linear and have constant coefficients, they can be readily extended to every space of generalized functions.

==== Relation with complex differentiation ====
When a function $f$ is complex differentiable at a point, the Wirtinger derivative $\partial f/\partial z$ agrees with the complex derivative $df/dz$. This follows from the Cauchy-Riemann equations. For the complex function $f(z) = u(z) + iv(z)$ which is complex differentiable

$$\begin{align}
\frac{\partial f}{\partial z} &= \frac{1}{2} \left( \frac{\partial f}{\partial x} - i \frac{\partial f}{\partial y} \right)
\\ &= \frac{1}{2} \left( \frac{\partial u}{\partial x} + i \frac{\partial v}{\partial x} -i \frac{\partial u}{\partial y} + \frac{\partial v}{\partial y} \right)
\\ &= \frac{\partial u}{\partial z} + i \frac{\partial v}{\partial z} = \frac{d f}{d z}
\end{align}$$

where the third equality uses the first definition of Wirtinger's derivatives for $u$ and $v$.

It can also be done through actual application of the Cauchy-Riemann equations.

$$\begin{align}
\frac{\partial f}{\partial z} &= \frac{1}{2} \left( \frac{\partial f}{\partial x} - i \frac{\partial f}{\partial y} \right)
\\ &= \frac{1}{2} \left( \frac{\partial u}{\partial x} + i \frac{\partial v}{\partial x} -i \frac{\partial u}{\partial y} + \frac{\partial v}{\partial y} \right)
\\ &= \frac{1}{2} \left( \frac{\partial u}{\partial x} + i \frac{\partial v}{\partial x} + i \frac{\partial v}{\partial x} + \frac{\partial u}{\partial x} \right)
\\ &= \frac{\partial u}{\partial x} + i \frac{\partial v}{\partial x} = \frac{d f}{d z}
\end{align}$$

The final equality comes from it being one of four equivalent formulations of the complex derivative through partial derivatives of the components.

The second Wirtinger derivative is also related with complex differentiation; $\frac{\partial f}{\partial \bar{z}} = 0$ is equivalent to the Cauchy-Riemann equations in a complex form.

== Basic properties ==
In the present section and in the following ones it is assumed that $z \in \Complex^n$ is a complex vector and that $z \equiv (x,y) = (x_1,\ldots,x_n,y_1,\ldots,y_n)$ where $x,y$ are real vectors, with n ≥ 1: also it is assumed that the subset $\Omega$ can be thought of as a domain in the real euclidean space $\R^{2n}$ or in its isomorphic complex counterpart $\Complex^n.$ All the proofs are easy consequences of definition 1 and definition 2 and of the corresponding properties of the derivatives (ordinary or partial).

=== Linearity ===
Lemma 1. If $f,g \in C^1(\Omega)$ and $\alpha,\beta$ are complex numbers, then for $i=1,\dots,n$ the following equalities hold

$$\begin{align}
\frac{\partial}{\partial z_i} \left(\alpha f+\beta g\right) &= \alpha\frac{\partial f}{\partial z_i} + \beta\frac{\partial g}{\partial z_i} \\
\frac{\partial}{\partial\bar{z}_i} \left(\alpha f+\beta g\right) &= \alpha\frac{\partial f}{\partial\bar{z}_i} + \beta\frac{\partial g}{\partial\bar{z}_i}
\end{align}$$

=== Product rule ===
Lemma 2. If $f,g \in C^1(\Omega),$ then for $i= 1,\dots,n$ the product rule holds

$$\begin{align}
\frac{\partial}{\partial z_i} (f\cdot g) &= \frac{\partial f}{\partial z_i}\cdot g + f\cdot\frac{\partial g}{\partial z_i} \\
\frac{\partial}{\partial\bar{z}_i} (f\cdot g) &= \frac{\partial f}{\partial\bar{z}_i}\cdot g + f\cdot\frac{\partial g}{\partial\bar{z}_i}
\end{align}$$

This property implies that Wirtinger derivatives are derivations from the abstract algebra point of view, exactly like ordinary derivatives are.

=== Chain rule ===
This property takes two different forms respectively for functions of one and several complex variables: for the n > 1 case, to express the chain rule in its full generality it is necessary to consider two domains $\Omega'\subseteq\Complex^m$ and $\Omega''\subseteq\Complex^p$ and two maps $g: \Omega'\to\Omega$ and $f:\Omega \to \Omega''$ having natural smoothness requirements.

==== Functions of one complex variable ====
Lemma 3.1 If $f,g \in C^1(\Omega),$ and $g(\Omega ) \subseteq \Omega,$ then the chain rule holds

$$\begin{align}
\frac{\partial}{\partial z} (f\circ g) &= \left(\frac{\partial f}{\partial z}\circ g \right) \frac{\partial g}{\partial z} + \left(\frac{\partial f}{\partial\bar{z}}\circ g \right) \frac{\partial\bar{g}}{\partial z} \\
\frac{\partial}{\partial\bar{z}} (f\circ g) &= \left(\frac{\partial f}{\partial z}\circ g \right)\frac{\partial g}{\partial\bar{z}}+ \left(\frac{\partial f}{\partial\bar{z}}\circ g \right) \frac{\partial\bar{g}}{\partial\bar{z}}
\end{align}$$

==== Functions of n > 1 complex variables ====
Lemma 3.2 If $g \in C^1(\Omega',\Omega)$ and $f \in C^1(\Omega,\Omega''),$ then for $i= 1,\dots,n$ the following form of the chain rule holds

$$\begin{align}
\frac{\partial}{\partial z_i} \left(f\circ g\right) &= \sum_{j=1}^n\left(\frac{\partial f}{\partial z_j}\circ g \right) \frac{\partial g_j}{\partial z_i} + \sum_{j=1}^n\left(\frac{\partial f}{\partial\bar{z}_j}\circ g \right) \frac{\partial \bar{g}_j}{\partial z_i} \\
\frac{\partial}{\partial\bar{z}_i} \left(f\circ g\right) &= \sum_{j=1}^n\left(\frac{\partial f}{\partial z_j}\circ g \right) \frac{\partial g_j}{\partial\bar{z}_i} + \sum_{j=1}^n\left(\frac{\partial f}{\partial\bar{z}_j}\circ g \right)\frac{\partial \bar{g}_j}{\partial\bar{z}_i}
\end{align}$$

=== Conjugation ===
Lemma 4. If $f\in C^1(\Omega),$ then for $i=1,\dots,n$ the following equalities hold

$$\begin{align}
\overline{\frac{\partial f}{\partial z_i}} &= \overline{\Big(\frac{\partial f}{\partial z_i}\Big)} =\frac{\partial \bar{f}}{\partial \bar{z}_i} \\
\overline{\frac{\partial f}{\partial \bar{z}_i}} &= \overline{\Big(\frac{\partial f}{\partial \bar{z}_i}\Big)} =\frac{\partial \bar{f}}{\partial z_i}
\end{align}$$

=== Non-trivial results ===
$$\begin{align}
\frac{\partial}{\partial\bar z}\left(\frac 1z\right)=\frac{\partial}{\partial \bar z}\left(\frac{\partial}{\partial z}(\ln(z\bar z))\right)=\left(\frac{\partial^2}{\partial x^2}+\frac{\partial^2}{\partial y^2}\right)\ln(x^2+y^2)=2\pi\delta(x,y)\equiv 2\pi\delta(z,\bar z)
\end{align}$$

The above result is also derived by regulating behavior of $z^{-1}$ term and is also related to the divergence theorem and residue theorem.

==== Relation to residue theorem ====
Let integration measure be expressed as $d^2z \equiv dzd\bar z \equiv dxdy \left|\frac{\partial (z,\bar z)}{\partial(x,y)}\right|=2dxdy$ and let vector indices be $v^z=v^x+iv^y,\quad v^{\bar z}=v^x-iv^y$. Then,

$$\begin{align}
\int d^2z\,\frac{\partial v^z}{\partial z}&=\int dxdy\,[(\partial_x v^x+\partial_y v^y)+i(-\partial_y v^x+\partial_xv^y)]\\
&=\oint[(-v^x\, dy+v^y\,dx)+i(-v^y\,dx-v^x\,dy)]\\
&=-i\oint d(x-iy)\,\cdot(v^x+iv^y)\\
&=-i\oint v^z \, d\bar z
\end{align}$$

Similarly it follows that $\int d^2z\frac{\partial v^{\bar z}}{\partial \bar z}=i\oint v^z\,d\bar z$ which results in a divergence theorem of the form:

$$\begin{align}
\int d^2z\,\left(\frac{\partial v^z}{\partial z}+\frac{\partial v^{\bar z}}{\partial \bar z}\right)=i\oint (v^z \, d\bar z-v^{\bar z}\,dz)
\end{align}$$

Using this relation, residue theorem is verified as consistent with $\delta(z,\bar z)$ as a complex form of Dirac delta distribution,$\oint dz \frac 1 z=i\int d^2z\,\frac{\partial}{\partial \bar z}\left(\frac 1z\right) =2\pi i$.

== See also ==
- CR–function
- Dolbeault complex
- Dolbeault operator
- Pluriharmonic function
