= Cauchy's inequality =

Cauchy's inequality may refer to:

- Cauchy–Schwarz inequality in a real or complex inner product space
- Cauchy's estimate, also called Cauchy's inequality, for the Taylor series coefficients of a complex analytic function
