= Harmonic conjugate =

Concept in mathematics

In mathematics, a real-valued function $u(x,y)$ defined on a connected open set $\Omega \subset \R^2$ is said to have a conjugate (function) $v(x,y)$ if and only if they are respectively the real and imaginary parts of a holomorphic function $f(z)$ of the complex variable $z:=x+iy\in\Omega.$ That is, $v$ is conjugate to $u$ if $f(z):=u(x,y)+iv(x,y)$ is holomorphic on $\Omega.$ As a first consequence of the definition, they are both harmonic real-valued functions on $\Omega$. Moreover, the conjugate of $u,$ if it exists, is unique up to an additive constant. Also, $u$ is conjugate to $v$ if and only if $v$ is conjugate to $-u$.

== Description ==
Equivalently, $v$ is conjugate to $u$ in $\Omega$ if and only if $u$ and $v$ satisfy the Cauchy–Riemann equations in $\Omega.$ As an immediate consequence of the latter equivalent definition, if $u$ is any harmonic function on $\Omega\subset\R^2,$ the function $-u_y$ is conjugate to $u_x$ for then the Cauchy–Riemann equations are just $\Delta u = 0$ and the symmetry of the mixed second order derivatives, $u_{xy}=u_{yx}.$ Therefore, a harmonic function $u$ admits a conjugated harmonic function if and only if the holomorphic function $g(z) := u_x(x,y) - i u_y(x,y)$ has a primitive $f(z)$ in $\Omega,$ in which case a conjugate of $u$ is, of course, $\operatorname{Im} f(x+iy).$ So any harmonic function always admits a conjugate function whenever its domain is simply connected, and in any case it admits a conjugate locally at any point of its domain.

There is an operator taking a harmonic function u on a simply connected region in $\R^2$ to its harmonic conjugate v (putting e.g. v(x_{0}) = 0 on a given x_{0} in order to fix the indeterminacy of the conjugate up to constants). This is well known in applications as (essentially) the Hilbert transform; it is also a basic example in mathematical analysis, in connection with singular integral operators. Conjugate harmonic functions (and the transform between them) are also one of the simplest examples of a Bäcklund transform (two PDEs and a transform relating their solutions), in this case linear; more complex transforms are of interest in solitons and integrable systems.

Geometrically u and v are related as having orthogonal trajectories, away from the zeros of the underlying holomorphic function; the contours on which u and v are constant cross at right angles. In this regard, u + iv would be the complex potential, where u is the potential function and v is the stream function.

== Examples ==
For example, consider the function
$$u(x,y) = e^x \sin y.$$

Since
$${\partial u \over \partial x } = e^x \sin y, \quad {\partial^2 u \over \partial x^2} = e^x \sin y$$
and
$${\partial u \over \partial y} = e^x \cos y, \quad {\partial^2 u \over \partial y^2} = - e^x \sin y,$$
it satisfies
$$\Delta u = \nabla^2 u = 0$$
($\Delta$ is the Laplace operator) and is thus harmonic. Now suppose we have a $v(x,y)$ such that the Cauchy–Riemann equations are satisfied:

$${\partial u \over \partial x} = {\partial v \over \partial y} = e^x \sin y$$
and
$${\partial u \over \partial y} = -{\partial v \over \partial x} =  e^x \cos y.$$

Simplifying,
$${\partial v \over \partial y} = e^x \sin y$$
and
$${\partial v \over \partial x} = -e^x \cos y$$
which when solved gives
$$v = -e^x \cos y + C.$$

Observe that if the functions related to u and v were interchanged, the functions would not be harmonic conjugates, since the minus sign in the Cauchy–Riemann equations makes the relationship asymmetric.

The conformal mapping property of analytic functions (at points where the derivative is not zero) gives rise to a geometric property of harmonic conjugates. Clearly the harmonic conjugate of x is y, and the lines of constant x and constant y are orthogonal. Conformality says that contours of constant u(x, y) and v(x, y) will also be orthogonal where they cross (away from the zeros of f ′(z)). That means that v is a specific solution of the orthogonal trajectory problem for the family of contours given by u (not the only solution, naturally, since we can take also functions of v): the question, going back to the mathematics of the seventeenth century, of finding the curves that cross a given family of non-intersecting curves at right angles.
