= Cauchy's integral formula =

Provides integral formulas for all derivatives of a holomorphic function

In mathematics, Cauchy's integral formula, named after Augustin-Louis Cauchy, is a central statement in complex analysis. It expresses the fact that a holomorphic function defined on a disk is completely determined by its values on the boundary of the disk, and it provides integral formulas for all derivatives of a holomorphic function. Cauchy's formula shows that, in complex analysis, "differentiation is equivalent to integration": complex differentiation, like integration, behaves well under uniform limits – a result that does not hold in real analysis.

== Theorem ==
Let $U\subset\mathbb{C}$ be an open subset of the complex plane $\C$, and suppose the closed disk $D$ defined as
$$D = \bigl\{z\in\mathbb{C}:|z - z_0| \leq r\bigr\}$$
is completely contained in $U$. Let $f:U\to\mathbb{C}$ be a holomorphic function, and let $\gamma$ be the circle, oriented counterclockwise, forming the boundary of $D$. Then for every $a$ in the interior of $D$,
$$f(a) = \frac{1}{2\pi i} \oint_\gamma \frac{f(z)}{z-a}\,dz.$$

The proof of this statement uses the Cauchy integral theorem and like that theorem, it only requires $f$ to be complex differentiable. Because $\frac{1}{z-a}$ can be expanded as a power series in the variable $a$ as
$$\frac{1}{z-a} = \frac{1+\frac{a}{z}+\left(\frac{a}{z}\right)^2+\cdots}{z},$$
it follows that holomorphic functions are analytic, i.e. they can be expanded as convergent power series. In particular $f$ is actually infinitely differentiable, with
$$f^{(n)}(a) = \frac{n!}{2\pi i} \oint_\gamma \frac{f(z)}{\left(z-a\right)^{n+1}}\,dz.$$

This formula is sometimes referred to as Cauchy's differentiation formula.

The theorem stated above can be generalized. The circle $\gamma$ can be replaced by any closed rectifiable curve in $U$ that has winding number one about $a$. Moreover, as for the Cauchy integral theorem, it is sufficient to require that $f$ be holomorphic in the open region enclosed by the path and continuous on its closure.

Note that not every continuous function on the boundary can be used to produce a function inside the boundary that fits the given boundary function. For instance, if we put the function $\textstyle f(z) = \frac{1}{z}$, defined for $\vert z \vert = 1$, into the Cauchy integral formula, we get zero for all points inside the circle. In fact, giving just the real part on the boundary of a holomorphic function is enough to determine the function up to an imaginary constant – there is only one imaginary part on the boundary that corresponds to the given real part, up to addition of a constant. We can use a combination of a Möbius transformation and the Stieltjes inversion formula to construct the holomorphic function from the real part on the boundary. For example, the function $f(z)=i-iz$ has real part $\Re(f(z)) = \Im(z)$. On the unit circle this can be written $\textstyle \frac{1}{2}\left(\frac{i}{z}-iz\right)$. Using the Möbius transformation and the Stieltjes formula we construct the function inside the circle. The $\textstyle \frac{i}{z}$ term makes no contribution, and we find the function $-iz$. This has the correct real part on the boundary, and also gives us the corresponding imaginary part, but off by a constant, namely $i$.

== Proof sketch ==
By using the Cauchy integral theorem, one can show that the integral over $C$ (or the closed rectifiable curve) is equal to the same integral taken over an arbitrarily small circle around $a$. Since $f(z)$ is continuous, we can choose a circle small enough on which $f(z)$ is arbitrarily close to $f(a)$. On the other hand, the integral
$$\oint_C  \frac{1}{z-a} \,dz = 2 \pi i,$$
over any circle $C$ centered at $a$. This can be calculated directly via a parametrization (integration by substitution) $z(t)=a+\varepsilon e^{it}$ where $0\leq t\leq 2\pi$ and $\varepsilon$ is the radius of the circle.

Letting $\varepsilon\to 0$ gives the desired estimate
$$\begin{align}
\left | \frac{1}{2 \pi i} \oint_C \frac{f(z)}{z-a} \,dz  - f(a) \right |
&= \left | \frac{1}{2 \pi i} \oint_C \frac{f(z)-f(a)}{z-a} \,dz \right | \\[1ex]
&= \left | \frac{1}{2\pi i}\int_0^{2\pi}\left(\frac{f\bigl(z(t)\bigr)-f(a)}{\varepsilon e^{it}}\cdot\varepsilon e^{it} i\right )\,dt\right | \\[1ex]
&\leq \frac{1}{2 \pi} \int_0^{2\pi} \frac{ \left|f\bigl(z(t)\bigr) - f(a)\right| } {\varepsilon} \,\varepsilon\,dt \\[1ex]
&\leq \max_{|z-a|=\varepsilon} \left|f(z) - f(a)\right|
~~ \xrightarrow[\varepsilon\to 0]{} ~~ 0.
\end{align}$$

== Example ==
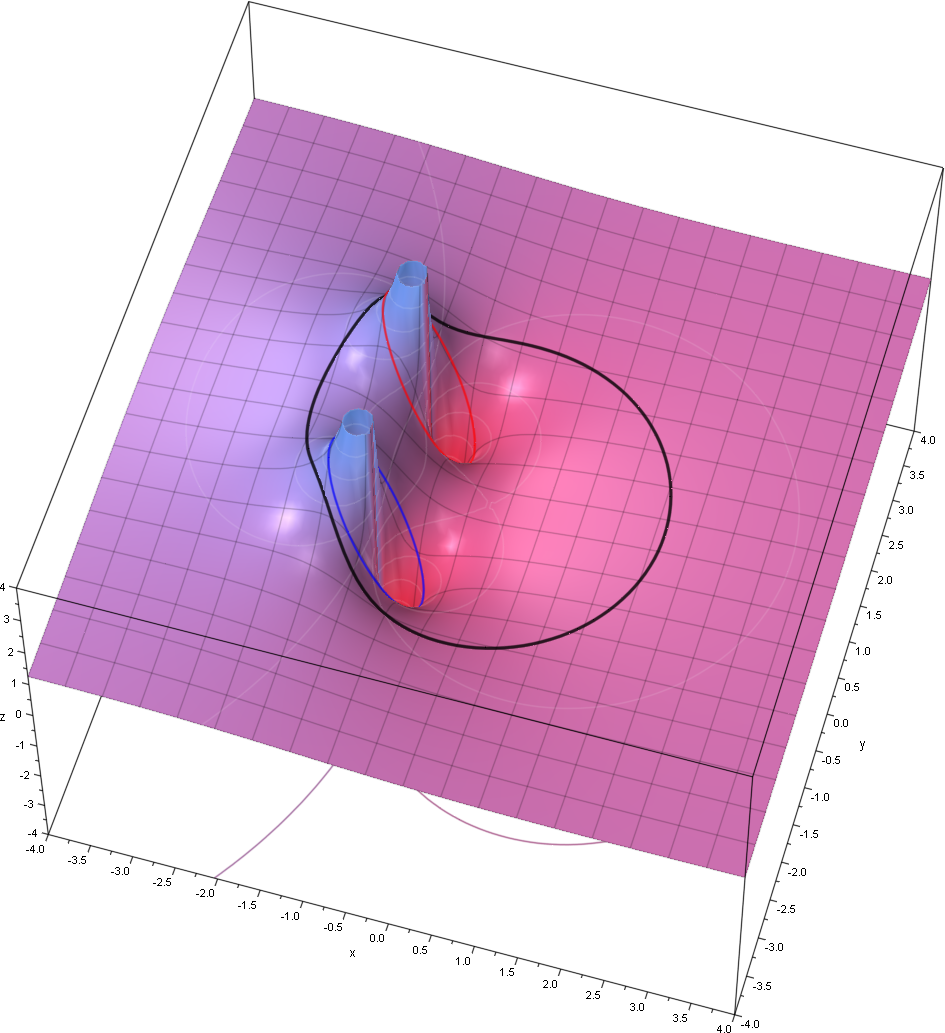
Surface of the real part of the function $\textstyle g(z)=\frac{z^2}{z^2+2z+2}$ and its singularities, with the contours described in the text.

Let
$$g(z) = \frac{z^2}{z^2+2z+2},$$
and let $C$ be the contour described by $|z|=2$ (the circle of radius 2).

To find the integral of $g(z)$ around the contour $C$, we need to know the singularities of $g(z)$. Observe that we can rewrite $g$ as follows:
$$g(z) = \frac{z^2}{(z-z_1)(z-z_2)}$$
where $z_1=-1+i$ and $z_2=-1-i$.

Thus, $g$ has poles at $z_1$ and $z_2$. The moduli of these points are less than 2 and thus lie inside the contour. This integral can be split into two smaller integrals by Cauchy–Goursat theorem; that is, we can express the integral around the contour as the sum of the integral around $z_1$ and $z_2$ where the contour is a small circle around each pole. Call these contours $C_1$ around $z_1$ and $C_2$ around $z_2$.

Now, each of these smaller integrals can be evaluated by the Cauchy integral formula, but they first must be rewritten to apply the theorem. For the integral around $C_1$, define $f_1$ as $f_1(z)=(z-z_1)g(z)$. This is analytic (since the contour does not contain the other singularity). We can simplify $f_1$ to be:
$$f_1(z) = \frac{z^2}{z-z_2}$$
and now
$$g(z) = \frac{f_1(z)}{z-z_1}.$$

Since the Cauchy integral formula says that:
$$\oint_C \frac{f_1(z)}{z-a}\, dz=2\pi i\cdot f_1(a),$$
we can evaluate the integral as follows:
$$\oint_{C_1} g(z)\,dz
=\oint_{C_1} \frac{f_1(z)}{z-z_1}\,dz
=2\pi i\frac{z_1^2}{z_1-z_2}.$$

Doing likewise for the other contour:
$$f_2(z) = \frac{z^2}{z-z_1},$$
we evaluate
$$\oint_{C_2} g(z)\,dz
=\oint_{C_2} \frac{f_2(z)}{z-z_2}\,dz
=2\pi i\frac{z_2^2}{z_2-z_1}.$$

The integral around the original contour $C$ then is the sum of these two integrals:
$$\begin{align}
\oint_C g(z)\,dz
&{}= \oint_{C_1} g(z)\,dz
+ \oint_{C_2} g(z)\,dz \\[.5em]
&{}= 2\pi i\left(\frac{z_1^2}{z_1-z_2}+\frac{z_2^2}{z_2-z_1}\right) \\[.5em]
&{}= 2\pi i(-2) \\[.3em]
&{}=-4\pi i.
\end{align}$$

An elementary trick using partial fraction decomposition:
$$\oint_C g(z)\,dz
=\oint_C \left(1-\frac{1}{z-z_1}-\frac{1}{z-z_2}\right) \, dz
=0-2\pi i-2\pi i
=-4\pi i$$

== Consequences ==
The integral formula has broad applications. First, it implies that a function that is holomorphic in an open set is in fact infinitely differentiable there. Furthermore, it is an analytic function, meaning that it can be represented as a power series. The proof of this uses the dominated convergence theorem and the geometric series applied to
$$f(\zeta) = \frac{1}{2\pi i}\int_C \frac{f(z)}{z-\zeta}\,dz.$$

The formula is also used to prove the residue theorem, which is a result for meromorphic functions, and a related result, the argument principle. It is known from Morera's theorem that the uniform limit of holomorphic functions is holomorphic. This can also be deduced from Cauchy's integral formula: indeed the formula also holds in the limit and the integrand, and hence the integral, can be expanded as a power series. In addition the Cauchy formulas for the higher order derivatives show that all these derivatives also converge uniformly.

The analog of the Cauchy integral formula in real analysis is the Poisson integral formula for harmonic functions; many of the results for holomorphic functions carry over to this setting. No such results, however, are valid for more general classes of differentiable or real analytic functions. For instance, the existence of the first derivative of a real function need not imply the existence of higher order derivatives, nor in particular the analyticity of the function. Likewise, the uniform limit of a sequence of (real) differentiable functions may fail to be differentiable, or may be differentiable but with a derivative that is not the limit of the derivatives of the members of the sequence.

Another consequence is that if $f(z)=\sum a_n z^n$ is holomorphic in $|z|<R$ and $0<r<R$ then the coefficients $a_n$ satisfy Cauchy's estimate
$$|a_n| = \bigg| \underbrace{
\frac{1}{2\pi i}\int_C \frac{f(z)}{(z-\zeta)^{n+1}}\,dz\,}_{=a_n} \bigg| \le r^{-n} \sup_{|z|=r}|f(z)|.$$

From Cauchy's estimate, one can easily deduce that every bounded entire function must be constant (which is Liouville's theorem).

The formula can also be used to derive Gauss's mean-value theorem, which states
$$f(z) = \frac{1}{2\pi} \int_{0}^{2\pi} f(z + r e^{i\theta}) \, d\theta.$$

In other words, the average value of $f$ over the circle centered at $z$ with radius $r$ is $f(z)$. This can be calculated directly via a parametrization of the circle.

== Generalizations ==
=== Smooth functions ===
A version of Cauchy's integral formula is the Cauchy–Pompeiu formula, and holds for smooth functions as well, as it is based on Stokes' theorem. Let $D$ be a disc in $\mathbb{C}$ and suppose that $f$ is a complex-valued C^{1} function on the closure of $D$. Then
$$f(\zeta) = \frac{1}{2\pi i}\int_{\partial D} \frac{f(z) \,dz}{z-\zeta} - \frac{1}{\pi}\iint_D \frac{\partial f}{\partial \bar{z}}(z) \frac{dx\wedge dy}{z-\zeta}.$$

One may use this representation formula to solve the inhomogeneous Cauchy–Riemann equations in $D$. Indeed, if $\varphi$ is a function in $D$, then a particular solution $f$ of the equation is a holomorphic function outside the support of $\mu$. Moreover, if in an open set $D$,
$$d\mu = \frac{1}{2\pi i}\varphi \, dz\wedge d\bar{z}$$
for some $\varphi\in C^k(D)$ (where $k\geq 1$, then $f(\zeta,\bar\zeta)$ is also in $C^k(D)$ and satisfies the equation
$$\frac{\partial f}{\partial\bar{z}} = \varphi(z,\bar{z}).$$

The first conclusion is, succinctly, that the convolution $\mu\ast k(z)$ of a compactly supported measure with the Cauchy kernel
$$k(z) = \operatorname{p.v.}\frac{1}{z}$$
is a holomorphic function off the support of $\mu$. Here $\operatorname{p.v.}$ denotes the principal value. The second conclusion asserts that the Cauchy kernel is a fundamental solution of the Cauchy–Riemann equations. Note that for smooth complex-valued functions $f$ of compact support on $\mathbb{C}$ the generalized Cauchy integral formula simplifies to
$$f(\zeta) =  \frac{1}{2\pi i}\iint \frac{\partial f}{\partial \bar{z}}\frac{dz\wedge d\bar{z}}{z-\zeta},$$
and is a restatement of the fact that, considered as a distribution, $(\pi z)^{-1}$ is a fundamental solution of the Cauchy–Riemann operator $\textstyle \frac{\partial}{\partial z}$.

The generalized Cauchy integral formula can be deduced for any bounded open region $X$ with $C^1$ boundary $\partial X$ from this result and the formula for the distributional derivative of the characteristic function $\chi_X$ of $X$:
$$\frac {\partial \chi_X}{\partial \bar z}= \frac{i}{2} \oint_{\partial X} \,dz,$$
where the distribution on the right hand side denotes contour integration along $\partial X$.

Proof

For $\varphi \in \mathcal{D}(X)$ calculate:
$$\begin{aligned}
\left\langle\frac{\partial}{\partial \bar{z}}\left(\chi_X\right), \varphi\right\rangle & =-\int_X \frac{\partial \varphi}{\partial \bar{z}} \mathrm{~d}(x, y) \\
& =-\frac{1}{2} \int_X\left(\partial_x \varphi+\mathrm{i} \partial_y \varphi\right) \mathrm{d}(x, y) .
\end{aligned}$$
then traverse $\partial X$ in the anti-clockwise direction. Fix a point $p \in \partial X$ and let $s$ denote arc length on $\partial X$ measured from $p$ anti-clockwise. Then, if $\ell$ is the length of $\partial X,[0, \ell] \ni s \mapsto(x(s), y(s))$ is a parametrization of $\partial X$. The derivative $\tau=\left(x'(s), y'(s)\right)$ is a unit tangent to $\partial X$ and $\nu:=\left(-y'(s), x'(s)\right)$ is the unit outward normal on $\partial X$. We are lined up for use of the divergence theorem: put $V=(\varphi, \mathrm{i} \varphi) \in \mathcal{D}(X)^2$ so that $\operatorname{div} V=\partial_x \varphi+\mathrm{i} \partial_y \varphi$ and we get
$$\begin{aligned}
-\frac{1}{2} \int_X\left(\partial_x \varphi+\mathrm{i} \partial_y \varphi\right) \mathrm{d}(x, y) & =-\frac{1}{2} \int_{\partial X} V \cdot \nu \mathrm{d} S \\
& =-\frac{1}{2} \int_0^{\ell}\left(\varphi \nu_1+\mathrm{i} \varphi \nu_2\right) \mathrm{d} s \\
& =-\frac{1}{2} \int_0^{\ell} \varphi(x(s), y(s))\left(y'(s)-\mathrm{i} x'(s)\right) \mathrm{d} s \\
& =\frac{1}{2} \int_0^{\ell} \mathrm{i} \varphi(x(s), y(s))\left(x'(s)+\mathrm{i} y'(s)\right) \mathrm{d} s \\
& =\frac{\mathrm{i}}{2} \int_{\partial X} \varphi \mathrm{d} z
\end{aligned}$$

Hence we proved $1 = \frac {\partial \chi_X}{\partial \bar z} = \frac{i}{2} \oint_{\partial X} \,dz$.

Now we can deduce the generalized Cauchy integral formula:

Proof

Since $u=\frac{\chi_X}{\pi\left(z-z_0\right)} \in \mathrm{L}_{\text{loc}}^1(X)$ and since $z_0 \in X$ this distribution is locally in $X$ of the form "distribution times $C^\infty$ function", so we may apply the Leibniz rule to calculate its derivatives:
$$\frac{\partial u}{\partial \bar{z}} =\frac{\partial}{\partial \bar{z}}\left(\frac{1}{\pi\left(z-z_0\right)}\right) \chi_X+\frac{1}{\pi\left(z-z_0\right)} \frac{\partial}{\partial \bar{z}}\left(\chi_X\right)$$

Using that $(\pi z)^{-1}$ is a fundamental solution of the Cauchy–Riemann operator $\frac{\partial}{\partial z}$, we get $\textstyle \frac{\partial}{\partial \bar{z} }\left(\frac{1}{\pi\left(z-z_0\right)}\right)=\delta_{z_0}$:
$$\frac{\partial u}{\partial \bar{z}}=\delta_{z_0}+\frac{1}{\pi\left(z-z_0\right)} \frac{\partial}{\partial \bar{z}}\left(\chi_X\right)$$

Applying $\frac{\partial u}{\partial \bar{z}}$ to $\phi \in \mathcal{D}(X)$:
$$\begin{aligned}
\left\langle\frac{\partial}{\partial \bar{z}}\left(\frac{\chi_X}{\pi\left(z-z_0\right)}\right), \phi\right\rangle & =\phi\left(z_0\right)+\left\langle\frac{1}{\pi\left(z-z_0\right)} \frac{\partial}{\partial \bar{z}}\left(\chi_X\right), \phi\right\rangle \\
& =\phi\left(z_0\right)+\left\langle\frac{\partial}{\partial \bar{z}}\left(\chi_X\right), \frac{\phi}{\pi\left(z-z_0\right)}\right\rangle \\
& =\phi\left(z_0\right)+\frac{\mathrm{i}}{2} \int_{\partial X} \frac{\phi(z)}{\pi\left(z-z_0\right)} \mathrm{d} z
\end{aligned}$$
where $\frac {\partial \chi_X}{\partial \bar z}= \frac{i}{2} \oint_{\partial X} \,dz$ is used in the last line.

Rearranging, we get
$$\phi(z_0)={\frac {1}{2\pi i}}\int _{\partial X}{\frac {\phi(z)\,dz}{z-z_0 }}-{\frac {1}{\pi }}\iint _X{\frac {\partial \phi}{\partial {\bar {z}}}}(z){\frac {dx\wedge dy}{z-z_0 }}.$$
as desired.

=== Several variables ===
In several complex variables, the Cauchy integral formula can be generalized to polydiscs. Let $D$ be the polydisc given as the Cartesian product of $n$ open discs $D_1,\ldots,D_n$:
$$D = \prod_{j=1}^n D_j.$$

Suppose that $f$ is a holomorphic function in $D$ continuous on the closure of $D$. Then
$$f(\zeta) = \frac{1}{\left(2\pi i\right)^n}\int\cdots\iint_{\partial D_1\times\cdots\times\partial D_n} \frac{f(z_1,\ldots,z_n)}{(z_1-\zeta_1)\cdots(z_n-\zeta_n)} \, dz_1\cdots dz_n$$
where $\zeta=(\zeta_1,\ldots,\zeta_n)\in D$.

=== In real algebras ===
The Cauchy integral formula is generalizable to real vector spaces of two or more dimensions. The insight into this property comes from geometric algebra, where objects beyond scalars and vectors (such as planar bivectors and volumetric trivectors) are considered, and a proper generalization of Stokes' theorem.

Geometric calculus defines a derivative operator $\nabla=\hat e_j\partial_j$ under its geometric product – that is, for a $k$-vector field $\psi(r)$, the derivative $\nabla\psi$ generally contains terms of grade $k+1$ and $k-1$. For example, a vector field $k=1$ generally has in its derivative a scalar part, the divergence ($k=0$), and a bivector part, the curl ($k=2$). This particular derivative operator has a Green's function:
$$G\left(\mathbf r, \mathbf r'\right) = \frac{1}{S_n} \frac{\mathbf r - \mathbf r'}{\left|\mathbf r - \mathbf r'\right|^n}$$
where $S_n$ is the surface area of a unit $n$-ball in the space (that is, $S_2=2\pi$, the circumference of a circle with radius $1$, and $S_3=4\pi$, the surface area of a sphere with radius $1$). By definition of a Green's function,
$$\nabla G\left(\mathbf r, \mathbf r'\right) = \delta\left(\mathbf r- \mathbf r'\right).$$

It is this useful property that can be used, in conjunction with the generalized Stokes theorem:
$$\oint_{\partial V} d\mathbf S \; f(\mathbf r) = \int_V d\mathbf V \; \nabla f(\mathbf r)$$
where, for an $n$-dimensional vector space, $dS$ is an $n-1$-vector and $dV$ is an $n$-vector. The function $f(r)$ can, in principle, be composed of any combination of multivectors. The proof of Cauchy's integral theorem for higher dimensional spaces relies on the using the generalized Stokes theorem on the quantity $G(r,r')f(r)$ and use of the product rule:
$$\oint_{\partial V'} G\left(\mathbf r, \mathbf r'\right)\;  d\mathbf S' \; f\left(\mathbf r'\right)
= \int_V \left(\left[\nabla' G\left(\mathbf r, \mathbf r'\right)\right] f\left(\mathbf r'\right) + G\left(\mathbf r, \mathbf r'\right) \nabla' f\left(\mathbf r'\right)\right) \; d\mathbf V$$

When $\nabla f=0$, $f(r)$ is called a monogenic function, the generalization of holomorphic functions to higher-dimensional spaces – indeed, it can be shown that the Cauchy–Riemann condition is just the two-dimensional expression of the monogenic condition. When that condition is met, the second term in the right-hand integral vanishes, leaving only
$$\oint_{\partial V'} G\left(\mathbf r, \mathbf r'\right)\;  d\mathbf S' \; f\left(\mathbf r'\right)
= \int_V \left[\nabla' G\left(\mathbf r, \mathbf r'\right)\right] f\left(\mathbf r'\right)
= -\int_V \delta\left(\mathbf r - \mathbf r'\right) f\left(\mathbf r'\right) \; d\mathbf V
=- i_n f(\mathbf r)$$
where $i_n$ is that algebra's unit $n$-vector, the pseudoscalar. The result is
$$f(\mathbf r)
=- \frac{1}{i_n} \oint_{\partial V} G\left(\mathbf r, \mathbf r'\right)\;  d\mathbf S \; f\left(\mathbf r'\right)
= -\frac{1}{i_n} \oint_{\partial V} \frac{\mathbf r - \mathbf r'}{S_n \left|\mathbf r - \mathbf r'\right|^n} \; d\mathbf S \; f\left(\mathbf r'\right)$$

Thus, as in the two-dimensional (complex analysis) case, the value of an analytic (monogenic) function at a point can be found by an integral over the surface surrounding the point, and this is valid not only for scalar functions but vector and general multivector functions as well.

=== Matrix and operator-valued functions ===
Cauchy's integral formula can be generalized to matrices and bounded linear operators on a Banach space. If $f$ is holomorphic on an open set containing the spectrum $\sigma(T)$ of a bounded linear operator $T$, the operator-valued function $f(T)$ can be defined as:
$$f(T) = \frac{1}{2\pi i} \oint_{\Gamma} f(z) (zI - T)^{-1} \, dz,$$
where $I$ is the identity operator, $\Gamma$ is a positively oriented Jordan curve (or a union of such curves) surrounding $\sigma(T)$ within the domain of holomorphy, and $\textstyle R(z; T) = (zI - T)^{-1}$ is the resolvent of $T$.

In finite dimensions, when applied to a matrix $A$, this contour integral evaluates a matrix function $f(A)$, where $\Gamma$ is a contour path enclosing all distinct eigenvalues $\lambda_1, \dots, \lambda_m$ of $A$. Integrating over a component contour $\Gamma_i$ isolating a single eigenvalue $\lambda_i$ with $f(z) = 1$ yields the generalized Frobenius covariant $F_i(A)$:
$$F_i(A) = \frac{1}{2\pi i} \oint_{\Gamma_i} (zI - A)^{-1} \, dz.$$
The matrix $F_i(A)$ is a projection matrix onto the generalized eigenspace associated with $\lambda_i$, commutes with both $A$ and $f(A)$, and satisfies $\textstyle \sum_{i=1}^m F_i(A) = I$. More generally, integrating $f$ over $\Gamma_i$ evaluates the contribution $F_i(A) f(A)$ associated with $\lambda_i$, allowing matrix functions to be expressed as a sum of contributions from each eigenvalue.

=== Confluent divided differences ===
Cauchy's integral formula generalizes directly to the computation of confluent divided differences, which extend standard divided differences to the case where some or all nodes coincide.

When $f$ is analytic on a simply connected domain $\Omega \subset \C$ containing the nodes $x_0, \dots, x_n$, including the confluent case of repeated nodes in arbitrary order, the divided difference admits a contour integral representation given by:
$$f[x_0, \dots, x_n] = \frac{1}{2\pi i} \oint_{\Gamma} \frac{f(z)}{\prod_{k=0}^n (z - x_k)} \, dz,$$
where $\Gamma$ is a positively oriented, simple closed contour in $\Omega$ enclosing all the nodes $x_0, \dots, x_n$.

When all nodes are distinct, this formula evaluates the $n$th order divided difference over discrete points. When all nodes coincide:
$$x_0 = x_1 = \dots = x_n = a,$$
the denominator acquires higher-order poles, and the integral reduces via Cauchy's differentiation formula to:
$$f[\underbrace{a, \dots, a}_{n+1 \text{ times}}] = \frac{1}{2\pi i} \oint_{\Gamma} \frac{f(z)}{(z - a)^{n+1}} \, dz = \frac{f^{(n)}(a)}{n!}.$$
Thus, the contour integral provides a unified formulation that seamlessly handles both distinct nodes and confluent nodes with higher-order derivatives.

== See also ==
- Cauchy–Riemann equations
- Methods of contour integration
- Nachbin's theorem
- Morera's theorem
- Mittag-Leffler's theorem
- Green's function generalizes this idea to the non-linear setup
- Schwarz integral formula
- Parseval–Gutzmer formula
- Bochner–Martinelli formula
- Helffer–Sjöstrand formula
