= Cauchy's estimate =

Formula in complex analysis

In mathematics, specifically in complex analysis, Cauchy's estimate gives local bounds for the derivatives of a holomorphic function. These bounds are optimal.

Cauchy's estimate is also called Cauchy's inequality, but must not be confused with the Cauchy–Schwarz inequality.

== Statement and consequence ==
Let $f$ be a holomorphic function on the open ball $B(a, r)$ in $\mathbb C$. If $M$ is the sup of $|f|$ over $B(a, r)$, then Cauchy's estimate says: for each integer $n > 0$,

$$|f^{(n)}(a)| \le \frac{n!}{r^n} M$$

where $f^{(n)}$ is the n-th complex derivative of $f$; i.e., $f' = \frac{\partial f}{\partial z}$ and $f^{(n)} = (f^{(n-1)})^'$ (see Wirtinger derivatives § Relation with complex differentiation).

Moreover, taking $f(z) = z^n, a = 0, r = 1$ shows the above estimate cannot be improved.

As a corollary, for example, we obtain Liouville's theorem, which says a bounded entire function is constant (indeed, let $r \to \infty$ in the estimate.) Slightly more generally, if $f$ is an entire function bounded by $A + B|z|^k$ for some constants $A, B$ and some integer $k > 0$, then $f$ is a polynomial.

== Proof ==
We start with Cauchy's integral formula applied to $f$, which gives for $z$ with $| z - a | < r'$,

$$f(z) = \frac{1}{2\pi i} \int_{|w-a| = r'} \frac{f(w)}{w - z} \, dw$$

where $r' < r$. By the differentiation under the integral sign (in the complex variable), we get:

$$f^{(n)}(z) = \frac{n!}{2\pi i} \int_{|w-a| = r'} \frac{f(w)}{(w - z)^{n+1}} \, dw.$$

Thus,

$$|f^{(n)}(a)| \le \frac{n!M}{2\pi} \int_{|w-a| = r'} \frac{|dw|}{|w - a|^{n+1}} = \frac{n!M}{{r'}^n}.$$

Letting $r' \to r$ finishes the proof. $\square$

(The proof shows it is not necessary to take $M$ to be the sup over the whole open disk, but because of the maximal principle, restricting the sup to the near boundary would not change $M$.)

== Related estimate ==
Here is a somehow more general but less precise estimate. It says: given an open subset $U \subset \mathbb{C}$, a compact subset $K \subset U$ and an integer $n > 0$, there is a constant $C$ such that for every holomorphic function $f$ on $U$,

$$\sup_{K} |f^{(n)}| \le C \int_U |f| \, d\mu$$

where $d\mu$ is the Lebesgue measure.

This estimate follows from Cauchy's integral formula (in the general form) applied to $u =\psi f$ where $\psi$ is a smooth function that is $=1$ on a neighborhood of $K$ and whose support is contained in $U$. Indeed, shrinking $U$, assume $U$ is bounded and the boundary of it is piecewise-smooth. Then, since $\partial u / \partial \overline{z} = f \partial \psi / \partial \overline{z}$, by the integral formula,

$$u(z) = \frac{1}{2\pi i} \int_{\partial U} \frac{u(z)}{w - z} \, dw + \frac{1}{2\pi i} \int_U \frac{f(w) \partial \psi/\partial \overline{w} (w)}{w - z} \, dw \wedge d\overline{w}$$

for $z$ in $U$ (since $K$ can be a point, we cannot assume $z$ is in $K$). Here, the first term on the right is zero since the support of $u$ lies in $U$. Also, the support of $\partial \psi/\partial \overline{w}$ is contained in $U - K$. Thus, after the differentiation under the integral sign, the claimed estimate follows.

As an application of the above estimate, we can obtain the Stieltjes–Vitali theorem, which says that a sequence of holomorphic functions on an open subset $U \subset \mathbb{C}$ that is bounded on each compact subset has a subsequence converging on each compact subset (necessarily to a holomorphic function since the limit satisfies the Cauchy–Riemann equations). Indeed, the estimate implies such a sequence is equicontinuous on each compact subset; thus, Ascoli's theorem and the diagonal argument give a claimed subsequence.

== In several variables ==
Cauchy's estimate is also valid for holomorphic functions in several variables. Namely, for a holomorphic function $f$ on a polydisc $U = \prod_{j=1}^n B(a_j, r_j) \subset \mathbb{C}^n$, we have: for each multiindex $\alpha \in \mathbb{N}^n$,

$$\left |\left(\frac{\partial}{\partial z}^{\alpha} f\right) (a) \right| \le \frac{\alpha!}{r^{\alpha}} \sup_U |f|$$

where $\frac{\partial}{\partial z}^{\alpha} = \prod_1^n \left(\frac{\partial}{\partial z_j}\right)^{\alpha_j}$, $\alpha! = \prod {\alpha}_j!$ and $r^{\alpha} = \prod r_j^{\alpha_j}$.

As in the one variable case, this follows from Cauchy's integral formula in polydiscs. § Related estimate and its consequence also continue to be valid in several variables with the same proofs.

== See also ==
- Taylor's theorem
- Schwarz lemma
