= Looman–Menchoff theorem =

In the mathematical field of complex analysis, the Looman–Menchoff theorem states that a continuous complex-valued function defined in an open set of the complex plane is holomorphic if and only if it satisfies the Cauchy–Riemann equations. It is thus a generalization of a theorem by Édouard Goursat, which instead of assuming the continuity of f, assumes its Fréchet differentiability when regarded as a function from a subset of R^{2} to R^{2}. This theorem bears the name of Dutch mathematician Herman Looman and Soviet mathematician Dmitrii Menshov.

== Statement ==
A complete statement of the theorem is as follows:

- Let Ω be an open set in C and f : Ω → C be a continuous function. Suppose that the partial derivatives $\partial f/\partial x$ and $\partial f/\partial y$ exist everywhere but a countable set in Ω. Then f is holomorphic if and only if it satisfies the Cauchy–Riemann equation:

$$\frac{\partial f}{\partial\bar{z}} = \frac{1}{2}\left(\frac{\partial f}{\partial x} + i\frac{\partial f}{\partial y}\right)=0.$$

== Examples ==
Looman pointed out that the function given by f(z) = exp(−z^{−4}) for z ≠ 0, f(0) = 0 satisfies the Cauchy–Riemann equations everywhere but is not analytic (or even continuous) at z = 0. This shows that the function f must be assumed continuous in the theorem.

The function given by f(z) = z^{5}/|z|^{4} for z ≠ 0, f(0) = 0 is continuous everywhere and satisfies the Cauchy–Riemann equations at z = 0, but is not analytic at z = 0 (or anywhere else). This shows that a naive generalization of the Looman–Menchoff theorem to a single point is false:

- Let f be continuous at a neighborhood of a point z, and such that $\partial f/\partial x$ and $\partial f/\partial y$ exist at z. Then f is holomorphic at z if and only if it satisfies the Cauchy–Riemann equation at z.
