= Cauchy's integral theorem =

Theorem in complex analysis

In mathematics, the Cauchy integral theorem (also known as the Cauchy–Goursat theorem) in complex analysis, named after Augustin-Louis Cauchy (and Édouard Goursat), is an important statement about line integrals for holomorphic functions in the complex plane. Essentially, it says that if $f(z)$ is holomorphic in a simply connected domain $\Omega$, then for any simple closed contour $C$ in $\Omega$, that contour integral is zero.
$$\int_C f(z)\,dz = 0.$$

== Statement ==
=== Fundamental theorem for complex line integrals ===
If $f(z)$ is a holomorphic function on an open region $U$, and $\gamma$ is a curve in $U$ from $z_0$ to $z_1$ then,
$$\int_{\gamma}f'(z) \, dz = f(z_1)-f(z_0).$$

Also, when $f(z)$ has a single-valued antiderivative in an open region $U$, then the path integral $\textstyle \int_{\gamma}f(z) \, dz$ is path independent for all paths in $U$.

==== Formulation on simply connected regions ====
Let $U \subseteq \Complex$ be a simply connected open set, and let $f: U \to \Complex$ be a holomorphic function. Let $\gamma: [a,b] \to U$ be a smooth closed curve. Then:
$$\int_\gamma f(z)\,dz = 0.$$
(The condition that $U$ be simply connected means that $U$ has no "holes", or in other words, that the fundamental group of $U$ is trivial.)

==== General formulation ====
Let $U \subseteq \Complex$ be an open set, and let $f: U \to \Complex$ be a holomorphic function. Let $\gamma: [a,b] \to U$ be a smooth closed curve. If $\gamma$ is homotopic to a constant curve, then:
$$\int_\gamma f(z)\,dz = 0 ,$$
where $z \in U$.

(Recall that a curve is homotopic to a constant curve if there exists a smooth homotopy (within $U$) from the curve to the constant curve. Intuitively, this means that one can shrink the curve into a point without exiting the space.) The first version is a special case of this because on a simply connected set, every closed curve is homotopic to a constant curve.

==== Main example ====
In both cases, it is important to remember that the curve $\gamma$ does not surround any "holes" in the domain, or else the theorem does not apply. A famous example is the following curve:
$$\gamma(t) = e^{it} \quad t \in \left[0, 2\pi\right] ,$$
which traces out the unit circle. Here the following integral:
$$\int_{\gamma} \frac{1}{z}\,dz = 2\pi i \neq 0 ,$$
is nonzero. The Cauchy integral theorem does not apply here since $f(z) = 1/z$ is not defined at $z = 0$. Intuitively, $\gamma$ surrounds a "hole" in the domain of $f$, so $\gamma$ cannot be shrunk to a point without exiting the space. Thus, the theorem does not apply.

== Discussion ==
As Édouard Goursat showed, Cauchy's integral theorem can be proven assuming only that the complex derivative $f'(z)$ exists everywhere in $U$. This is significant because one can then prove Cauchy's integral formula for these functions, and from that deduce these functions are infinitely differentiable.

The condition that $U$ be simply connected means that $U$ has no "holes" or, in homotopy terms, that the fundamental group of $U$ is trivial; for instance, every open disk $U_{z_0} = \{ z : \left\vert z-z_{0}\right\vert < r\}$, for $z_0 \in \C$, qualifies. The condition is crucial; consider
$$\gamma(t) = e^{it} \quad t \in \left[0, 2\pi\right]$$
which traces out the unit circle, and then the path integral
$$\oint_\gamma \frac{1}{z}\,dz = \int_0^{2\pi} \frac{1}{e^{it}}(ie^{it} \,dt) = \int_0^{2\pi}i\,dt = 2\pi i$$
is nonzero; the Cauchy integral theorem does not apply here since $f(z) = 1/z$ is not defined (and is certainly not holomorphic) at $z = 0$.

One important consequence of the theorem is that path integrals of holomorphic functions on simply connected domains can be computed in a manner familiar from the fundamental theorem of calculus: let $U$ be a simply connected open subset of $\C$, let $f: U \to \C$ be a holomorphic function, and let $\gamma$ be a piecewise continuously differentiable path in $U$ with start point $a$ and end point $b$. If $F$ is a complex antiderivative of $f$, then
$$\int_\gamma f(z)\,dz=F(b)-F(a).$$

The Cauchy integral theorem is valid with a weaker hypothesis than given above, e.g. given $U$, a simply connected open subset of $\C$, we can weaken the assumptions to $f$ being holomorphic on $U$ and continuous on $\overline{U}$ and $\gamma$ a rectifiable simple loop in $\textstyle \overline{U}$.

The Cauchy integral theorem leads to Cauchy's integral formula and the residue theorem.

== Proof ==
If one assumes that the partial derivatives of a holomorphic function are continuous, the Cauchy integral theorem can be proven as a direct consequence of Green's theorem and the fact that the real and imaginary parts of $f=u+iv$ must satisfy the Cauchy–Riemann equations in the region bounded by $\gamma$, and moreover in the open neighborhood U of this region. Cauchy provided this proof, but it was later proven by Goursat without requiring techniques from vector calculus, or the continuity of partial derivatives.

We can break the integrand $f$, as well as the differential $dz$ into their real and imaginary components:
$$f=u+iv$$
$$dz=dx+i\,dy$$

In this case we have
$$\oint_\gamma f(z)\,dz = \oint_\gamma (u+iv)(dx+i\,dy) = \oint_\gamma (u\,dx-v\,dy) +i\oint_\gamma (v\,dx+u\,dy)$$

By Green's theorem, we may then replace the integrals around the closed contour $\gamma$ with an area integral throughout the domain $D$ that is enclosed by $\gamma$ as follows:
$$\oint_\gamma (u\,dx-v\,dy) = \iint_D \left( -\frac{\partial v}{\partial x} -\frac{\partial u}{\partial y} \right) \,dx\,dy$$
$$\oint_\gamma (v\,dx+u\,dy) = \iint_D \left(  \frac{\partial u}{\partial x} -\frac{\partial v}{\partial y} \right) \,dx\,dy$$

But as the real and imaginary parts of a function holomorphic in the domain $D$, $u$ and $v$ must satisfy the Cauchy–Riemann equations there:
$$\frac{ \partial u }{ \partial x } = \frac{ \partial v }{ \partial y }$$
$$\frac{ \partial u }{ \partial y } = -\frac{ \partial v }{ \partial x }$$

We therefore find that both integrands (and hence their integrals) are zero:
$$\iint_D \left( -\frac{\partial v}{\partial x} -\frac{\partial u}{\partial y} \right )\,dx\,dy = \iint_D \left( \frac{\partial u}{\partial y} - \frac{\partial u}{\partial y} \right ) \, dx \, dy =0$$
$$\iint_D \left( \frac{\partial u}{\partial x}-\frac{\partial v}{\partial y} \right )\,dx\,dy = \iint_D \left( \frac{\partial u}{\partial x} - \frac{\partial u}{\partial x} \right ) \, dx \, dy = 0$$

This gives the desired result
$$\oint_\gamma f(z)\,dz = 0 .$$

== See also ==
- Morera's theorem
- Methods of contour integration
- Star domain
