= Hilbert's inequality =

Topic in mathematical analysis

In analysis, a branch of mathematics, Hilbert's inequality states that

$$\left|\sum_{r\neq s}\dfrac{u_{r}\overline{u_{s}}}{r-s}\right|\le\pi\displaystyle\sum_{r}|u_{r}|^2.$$

for any sequence u_{1},u_{2},... of complex numbers. It was first demonstrated by David Hilbert with the constant 2π instead of π; the sharp constant was found by Issai Schur. It implies that the discrete Hilbert transform is a bounded operator in ℓ_{2}.

== Formulation ==
Let (u_{m}) be a sequence of complex numbers. If the sequence is infinite, assume that it is square-summable:

$$\sum_m |u_m|^2 < \infty$$

Hilbert's inequality (see Steele (2004)) asserts that

$$\left|\sum_{r\neq s}\dfrac{u_{r}\overline{u_{s}}}{r-s}\right|\le\pi\displaystyle\sum_{r}|u_{r}|^2.$$

== Extensions ==
In 1973, Montgomery & Vaughan reported several generalizations of Hilbert's inequality, considering the bilinear forms

$$\sum_{r\neq s}u_r\overline u_s\csc\pi(x_r-x_s)$$

and

$$\sum_{r\neq s}\dfrac{u_r\overline u_s}{\lambda_r-\lambda_s},$$

where x_{1},x_{2},...,x_{m} are distinct real numbers modulo 1 (i.e. they belong to distinct classes in the quotient group R/Z) and λ_{1},...,λ_{m} are distinct real numbers. Montgomery & Vaughan's generalizations of Hilbert's inequality are then given by

$$\left|\sum_{r\neq s} u_r \overline{u_s}\csc\pi(x_r-x_s)\right|\le\delta^{-1}\sum_r |u_r|^2.$$

and

$$\left|\sum_{r\neq s}\dfrac{u_r\overline{u_s}}{\lambda_r-\lambda_s}\right|\le\pi\tau^{-1} \sum_r |u_r|^2.$$

where

$$\delta={\min_{r,s}}{}_{+}\|x_{r}-x_{s}\|, \quad \tau=\min_{r,s}{}_{+}\|\lambda_r-\lambda_s\|,$$

$$\|s\|= \min_{m\in\mathbb{Z}}|s-m|$$

is the distance from s to the nearest integer, and min_{+} denotes the smallest positive value. Moreover, if

$$0<\delta_r \le {\min_s}{}_{+}\|x_r-x_s\| \quad \text{and} \quad 0<\tau_{r}\le {\min_{s}}{}_{+}\|\lambda_r-\lambda_s\|,$$

then the following inequalities hold:

$$\left|\sum_{r\neq s} u_r\overline{u_s}\csc\pi(x_r-x_s)\right|\le\dfrac{3}{2} \sum_r |u_r|^2 \delta_r^{-1}.$$

and

$$\left|\sum_{r\neq s}\dfrac{u_r \overline{u_s}}{\lambda_r-\lambda_s}\right|\le \dfrac{3}{2} \pi \sum_r |u_r|^2\tau_r^{-1}.$$
