= Cauchy–Riemann equations =

Characteristic property of holomorphic functions

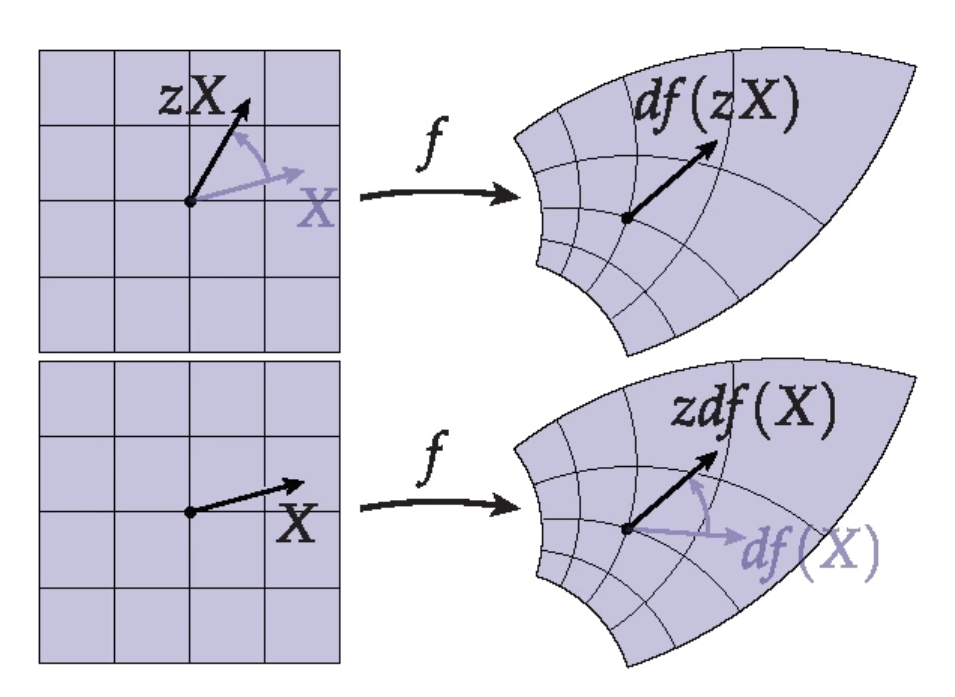
A visual depiction of a vector X in a domain being multiplied by a complex number z, then mapped by df, versus being mapped by df then being multiplied by z afterwards. If both of these result in the point ending up in the same place for all X and z, then f satisfies the Cauchy–Riemann condition at the basepoint.

In mathematics, the Cauchy–Riemann equations are two partial differential equations that characterize differentiability of complex functions. The equations are

$$\frac{\partial u}{\partial x} = \frac{\partial v}{\partial y}$$	1a

and

$$\frac{\partial u}{\partial y} = -\frac{\partial v}{\partial x},$$	1b

where u(x, y) and v(x, y) are real bivariate differentiable functions. Typically, u and v are the real and imaginary parts, respectively, of a complex-valued function
$$f(z) = f(x + i y) = u(x, y) + i v(x, y)$$
of a complex variable z = x + iy.

If f is complex-differentiable at a complex point z = x + iy, then the partial derivatives of u and v exist and satisfy the Cauchy–Riemann equations at that point. Conversely, if the functions u and v are (real) differentiable at z and satisfy the Cauchy-Riemann equations there, then f is complex-differentiable at z.

In this way, the Cauchy-Riemann equations are closely related to differentiability, which is in turn closely related to analyticity. These close relationships are the starting point of complex analysis.

== History ==
The Cauchy–Riemann equations first appeared in the work of Jean le Rond d'Alembert. Later, Leonhard Euler connected this system to the analytic functions. Augustin-Louis Cauchy then used these equations to construct his theory of functions. Bernhard Riemann's dissertation on the theory of functions appeared in 1851.

== Simple example ==
Suppose that $z = x + iy$. The complex-valued function $f(z) = z^2$ is differentiable at any point z in the complex plane.
$$f(z) = (x + iy)^2 = x^2 - y^2 + 2ixy$$
The real part $u(x,y)$ and the imaginary part $v(x, y)$ are
$$\begin{align}
u(x, y) &= x^2 - y^2 \\
v(x, y) &= 2xy
\end{align}$$
and their partial derivatives are
$$u_x = 2x;\quad u_y = -2y;\quad v_x = 2y;\quad v_y = 2x$$

We see that indeed the Cauchy–Riemann equations are satisfied, $u_x = v_y$ and $u_y = -v_x$.

== Interpretation and reformulation ==
The Cauchy-Riemann equations are one way of looking at the condition for a function to be differentiable in the sense of complex analysis: in other words, they encapsulate the notion of function of a complex variable by means of conventional differential calculus. In the theory there are several other major ways of looking at this notion, and the translation of the condition into other language is often needed.

=== Conformal mappings ===
First, the Cauchy–Riemann equations may be written in complex form

$${ i \frac{ \partial f }{ \partial x } } = \frac{ \partial f }{ \partial y } .$$	2

In this form, the equations correspond structurally to the condition that the Jacobian matrix is of the form
$$\begin{pmatrix}
a & -b  \\
b &  a
\end{pmatrix},$$
where $a = \partial u/\partial x = \partial v/\partial y$ and $b = \partial v/\partial x = -\partial u/\partial y$. A matrix of this form is the matrix representation of a complex number. Geometrically, such a matrix is always the composition of a rotation with a scaling, and in particular preserves angles. The Jacobian of a function f(z) takes infinitesimal line segments at the intersection of two curves in z and rotates them to the corresponding segments in f(z). Consequently, a function satisfying the Cauchy–Riemann equations, with a nonzero derivative, preserves the angle between curves in the plane. That is, the Cauchy–Riemann equations are the conditions for a function to be conformal.

Moreover, because the composition of a conformal transformation with another conformal transformation is also conformal, the composition of a solution of the Cauchy–Riemann equations with a conformal map must itself solve the Cauchy–Riemann equations. Thus the Cauchy–Riemann equations are conformally invariant.

=== Complex differentiability ===
Let
$$f(z) = u(z) + i \cdot v(z)$$
where $u$ and $v$ are real-valued functions, be a complex-valued function of a complex variable $z = x + i y$ where $x$ and $y$ are real variables. $f(z) = f(x + iy) = f(x,y)$ so the function can also be regarded as a function of real variables $x$ and $y$. Then, the complex-derivative of $f$ at a point $z_0=x_0+iy_0$ is defined by
$$f'(z_0) =\lim_{\underset{h\in\Complex}{h\to 0}} \frac{f(z_0+h)-f(z_0)}{h}$$
provided this limit exists (that is, the limit exists along every path approaching $z_{0}$, and does not depend on the chosen path).

A fundamental result of complex analysis is that $f$ is complex differentiable at $z_0$ (that is, it has a complex-derivative), if and only if the bivariate real functions $u(x+iy)$ and $v(x+iy)$ are differentiable at $(x_0,y_0),$ and satisfy the Cauchy–Riemann equations at this point.

In fact, if the complex derivative exists at $z_0$, then it may be computed by taking the limit at $z_0$ along the real axis and the imaginary axis, and the two limits must be equal. Along the real axis, the limit is
$$\lim_{\underset{h\in\Reals}{h\to 0}} \frac{f(z_0+h)-f(z_0)}{h} = \left.  \frac{\partial f}{\partial x} \right \vert_{z_0}$$
and along the imaginary axis, the limit is
$$\lim_{\underset{h\in \Reals}{h\to 0}} \frac{f(z_0+ih)-f(z_0)}{ih} = \left. \frac{1}{i}\frac{\partial f}{\partial y} \right \vert _{z_0}.$$

So, the equality of the derivatives implies
$$i \left. \frac{\partial f}{\partial x} \right \vert _{z_0} = \left. \frac{\partial f}{\partial y} \right \vert _{z_0}$$
which is the complex form of Cauchy–Riemann equations (2) at $z_0$.

(Note that if $f$ is complex differentiable at $z_0$, it is also real differentiable and the Jacobian of $f$ at $z_0$ is the complex scalar $f'(z_0)$, regarded as a real-linear map of $\mathbb C$, since the limit $|f(z)-f(z_0)-f'(z_0)(z-z_0)|/|z-z_0|\to 0$ as $z\to z_0$.)

Conversely, if f is differentiable at $z_{0}$ (in the real sense) and satisfies the Cauchy-Riemann equations there, then it is complex-differentiable at this point. Assume that f as a function of two real variables x and y is differentiable at z_{0} (real differentiable). This is equivalent to the existence of the following linear approximation
$$\Delta f(z_0) = f(z_0 + \Delta z) - f(z_0) = f_x \,\Delta x + f_y \,\Delta y + \eta(\Delta z)$$
where $f_x = \left. \frac{\partial f}{\partial x}\right \vert _{z_0}$, $f_y = \left. \frac{\partial f}{\partial y} \right \vert _{z_0}$, z = x + iy, and $\eta(\Delta z) / |\Delta z| \to 0$ as Δz → 0.

Since $\Delta z + \Delta \bar{z}= 2 \, \Delta x$ and $\Delta z - \Delta \bar{z}=2i \, \Delta y$, the above can be re-written as

$$\Delta f(z_0) = \frac{f_x - if_y}{2} \, \Delta z + \frac{f_x + if_y}{2} \, \Delta \bar{z} + \eta(\Delta z)\,$$
$$\frac{\Delta f}{\Delta z} = \frac{f_x -i f_y}{2}+ \frac{f_x + i f_y}{2}\cdot \frac{\Delta\bar{z}}{\Delta z} + \frac{\eta(\Delta z)}{\Delta z}, \;\;\;\;(\Delta z \neq 0).$$

Now, if $\Delta z$ is real, $\Delta\bar z/\Delta z = 1$, while if it is imaginary, then $\Delta\bar z/\Delta z=-1$. Therefore, the second term is independent of the path of the limit $\Delta z\to 0$ when (and only when) it vanishes identically: $f_x + i f_y=0$, which is precisely the Cauchy–Riemann equations in the complex form. This proof also shows that, in that case,
$$\left.\frac{df}{dz}\right|_{z_0} = \lim_{\Delta z\to 0}\frac{\Delta f}{\Delta z} = \frac{f_x - i f_y}{2}.$$

Note that the hypothesis of real differentiability at the point $z_0$ is essential and cannot be dispensed with. For example, the function $\textstyle f(x,y) = \sqrt{|xy|}$, regarded as a complex function with imaginary part identically zero, has both partial derivatives at $(x_0,y_0)=(0,0)$, and it moreover satisfies the Cauchy–Riemann equations at that point, but it is not differentiable in the sense of real functions (of several variables), and so the first condition, that of real differentiability, is not met. Therefore, this function is not complex differentiable.

Some sources state a sufficient condition for the complex differentiability at a point $z_0$ as, in addition to the Cauchy–Riemann equations, the partial derivatives of $u$ and $v$ be continuous at the point because this continuity condition ensures the existence of the aforementioned linear approximation. Note that it is not a necessary condition for the complex differentiability. For example, the function $f(z) = z^2e^{i/|z|}$ is complex differentiable at 0, but its real and imaginary parts have discontinuous partial derivatives there. Since complex differentiability is usually considered in an open set, where it in fact implies continuity of all partial derivatives (see below), this distinction is often elided in the literature.

=== Independence of the complex conjugate ===
The above proof suggests another interpretation of the Cauchy–Riemann equations. The complex conjugate of $z$, denoted $\bar{z}$, is defined by
$$\overline{x + iy} := x - iy$$
for real variables $x$ and $y$. Defining the two Wirtinger derivatives as
$$\frac{\partial}{\partial z}
= \frac{1}{2} \left( \frac{\partial}{\partial x} - i \frac{\partial}{\partial y} \right), \;\;\; \frac{\partial}{\partial\bar{z}}
= \frac{1}{2} \left( \frac{\partial}{\partial x} + i \frac{\partial}{\partial y} \right),$$
the Cauchy–Riemann equations can then be written as a single equation
$$\frac{\partial f}{\partial\bar{z}} = 0,$$
and the complex derivative of $f$ in that case is $\frac{df}{dz}=\frac{\partial f}{\partial z}.$ In this form, the Cauchy–Riemann equations can be interpreted as the statement that a complex function $f$ of a complex variable $z$ is independent of the variable $\bar{z}$. As such, we can view analytic functions as true functions of one complex variable ($z$) instead of complex functions of two real variables ($x$ and $y$).

=== Physical interpretation ===
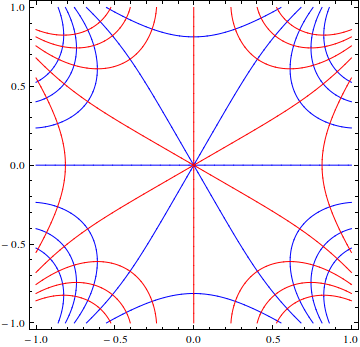
Contour plot of a pair u and v satisfying the Cauchy–Riemann equations. Streamlines (v = const, red) are perpendicular to equipotentials (u = const, blue). The point (0,0) is a stationary point of the potential flow, with six streamlines meeting, and six equipotentials also meeting and bisecting the angles formed by the streamlines.

A standard physical interpretation of the Cauchy–Riemann equations going back to Riemann's work on function theory is that u represents a velocity potential of an incompressible steady fluid flow in the plane, and v is its stream function. Suppose that the pair of (twice continuously differentiable) functions u and v satisfies the Cauchy–Riemann equations. We will take u to be a velocity potential, meaning that we imagine a flow of fluid in the plane such that the velocity vector of the fluid at each point of the plane is equal to the gradient of u, defined by
$$\nabla u = \frac{\partial u}{\partial x}\mathbf i + \frac{\partial u}{\partial y}\mathbf j.$$

By differentiating the Cauchy–Riemann equations for the functions u and v, with the symmetry of second derivatives, one shows that u solves Laplace's equation:
$$\frac{\partial^2u}{\partial x^2} + \frac{\partial^2u}{\partial y^2} = 0.$$
That is, u is a harmonic function. This means that the divergence of the gradient is zero, and so the fluid is incompressible.

The function v also satisfies the Laplace equation, by a similar analysis.

In vector form, the Cauchy–Riemann equations read $\nabla v = R \nabla u$ where R is the rotation through 90 degrees counterclockwise:

$$R = R(90^\circ) = \begin{bmatrix}
0 & -1 \\
1 & 0
\end{bmatrix}.$$

Thus the Cauchy–Riemann equations imply that $\nabla u$ and $\nabla v$ have the same magnitude, and their dot product is zero:
$$\nabla u\cdot\nabla v = 0.$$
Geometrically, the direction of the maximum slope of u and that of v are orthogonal to each other. This implies that the gradient of u must point along the $v = \text{const}$ curves; so these are the streamlines of the flow. The $u = \text{const}$ curves are the equipotential curves of the flow.

A holomorphic function can therefore be visualized by plotting the two families of level curves $u=\text{const}$ and $v=\text{const}$. Near points where the gradient of u (or, equivalently, v) is not zero, these families form an orthogonal family of curves. At the points where $\nabla u=0$, the stationary points of the flow, the equipotential curves of $u=\text{const}$ intersect. The streamlines also intersect at the same point, bisecting the angles formed by the equipotential curves.

=== Harmonic vector field ===
Another interpretation of the Cauchy–Riemann equations can be found in Pólya & Szegő. Suppose that u and v satisfy the Cauchy–Riemann equations in an open subset of R^{2}, and consider the vector field
$$\bar{f} = \begin{bmatrix} u\\ -v \end{bmatrix}$$
regarded as a (real) two-component vector. Then the second Cauchy–Riemann equation (1b) asserts that $\bar{f}$ is irrotational (its curl is 0):
$$\frac{\partial (-v)}{\partial x} - \frac{\partial u}{\partial y} = 0.$$

The first Cauchy–Riemann equation (1a) asserts that the vector field is solenoidal (or divergence-free):
$$\frac{\partial u}{\partial x} + \frac{\partial (-v)}{\partial y}=0.$$

Owing respectively to Green's theorem and the divergence theorem, such a field is necessarily a conservative one on any simply-connected domain, and it is free from sources or sinks, having net flux equal to zero through any open domain without holes. (These two observations combine as real and imaginary parts in Cauchy's integral theorem.) In fluid dynamics, such a vector field is a potential flow. In magnetostatics, such vector fields model static magnetic fields on a region of the plane containing no current. In electrostatics, they model static electric fields in a region of the plane containing no electric charge.

This interpretation can equivalently be restated in the language of differential forms. The pair u and v satisfy the Cauchy–Riemann equations if and only if the one-form $v\,dx + u\, dy$ is both closed and coclosed (a harmonic differential form).

=== Preservation of complex structure ===
Another formulation of the Cauchy–Riemann equations involves the complex structure in the plane, given by
$$J = \begin{bmatrix} 0 & -1 \\ 1 & 0 \end{bmatrix}.$$
This is a complex structure in the sense that the square of J is the negative of the 2×2 identity matrix: $J^2 = -I$. As above, if u(x,y) and v(x,y) are two functions in the plane, put

$$f(x,y) = \begin{bmatrix}u(x,y)\\v(x,y)\end{bmatrix}.$$

The Jacobian matrix of f is the matrix of partial derivatives
$$Df(x,y) = \begin{bmatrix}
\dfrac{\partial u}{\partial x} & \dfrac{\partial u}{\partial y} \\[5pt]
\dfrac{\partial v}{\partial x} & \dfrac{\partial v}{\partial y}
\end{bmatrix}$$

Then the pair of functions u, v satisfies the Cauchy–Riemann equations if and only if the 2×2 matrix Df commutes with J.

This interpretation is useful in symplectic geometry, where it is the starting point for the study of pseudoholomorphic curves.

=== Other representations ===
Other representations of the Cauchy–Riemann equations occasionally arise in other coordinate systems. If (1a) and (1b) hold for a differentiable pair of functions u and v, then so do
$$\frac{\partial u}{\partial n} =  \frac{\partial v}{\partial s},\quad
\frac{\partial v}{\partial n} = -\frac{\partial u}{\partial s}$$

for any coordinate system (n(x, y), s(x, y)) such that the pair $(\nabla n,\nabla s)$ is orthonormal and positively oriented. As a consequence, in particular, in the system of coordinates given by the polar representation $z = r e^{i\theta}$, the equations then take the form
$${\partial u \over \partial r} =  {1 \over r}{\partial v \over \partial\theta},\quad
{\partial v \over \partial r} = -{1 \over r}{\partial u \over \partial\theta}.$$

Combining these into one equation for f gives
$${\partial f \over \partial r} = {1 \over ir}{\partial f \over \partial\theta}.$$

The inhomogeneous Cauchy–Riemann equations consist of the two equations for a pair of unknown functions u(x, y) and v(x, y) of two real variables
$$\begin{align}
\frac{\partial u}{\partial x} - \frac{\partial v}{\partial y} &= \alpha(x, y) \\[4pt]
\frac{\partial u}{\partial y} + \frac{\partial v}{\partial x} &= \beta(x, y)
\end{align}$$

for some given functions α(x, y) and β(x, y) defined in an open subset of R^{2}. These equations are usually combined into a single equation
$$\frac{\partial f}{\partial\bar{z}} = \varphi(z,\bar{z})$$
where f = u + iv and 𝜑 = (α + iβ)/2.

If 𝜑 is C^{k}, then the inhomogeneous equation is explicitly solvable in any bounded domain D, provided 𝜑 is continuous on the closure of D. Indeed, by the Cauchy integral formula,
$$f\left(\zeta, \bar{\zeta}\right) = \frac{1}{2\pi i} \iint_D \varphi\left(z, \bar{z}\right) \, \frac{dz\wedge d\bar{z}}{z - \zeta}$$
for all ζ ∈ D.

== Generalizations ==
=== Goursat's theorem and its generalizations ===
Suppose that f = u + iv is a complex-valued function which is differentiable as a function $f : \mathbb{R}^2 \rarr \mathbb{R}^2$. Then Goursat's theorem asserts that f is analytic in an open complex domain Ω if and only if it satisfies the Cauchy–Riemann equation in the domain. In particular, continuous differentiability of f need not be assumed.

The hypotheses of Goursat's theorem can be weakened significantly. If f = u + iv is continuous in an open set Ω and the partial derivatives of f with respect to x and y exist in Ω, and satisfy the Cauchy–Riemann equations throughout Ω, then f is holomorphic (and thus analytic). This result is the Looman–Menchoff theorem.

The hypothesis that f obey the Cauchy–Riemann equations throughout the domain Ω is essential. It is possible to construct a continuous function satisfying the Cauchy–Riemann equations at a point, but which is not analytic at the point (e.g., f(z) = z^{5}/|z|^{4}). Similarly, some additional assumption is needed besides the Cauchy–Riemann equations (such as continuity), as the following example illustrates

$$f(z) = \begin{cases}
\exp\left(-z^{-4}\right) & \text{if }z \not= 0\\
0 & \text{if }z = 0
\end{cases}$$

which satisfies the Cauchy–Riemann equations everywhere, but fails to be continuous at z = 0.

Nevertheless, if a function satisfies the Cauchy–Riemann equations in an open set in a weak sense, then the function is analytic. More precisely:

If f(z) is locally integrable in an open domain $\Omega \isin \mathbb{C},$ and satisfies the Cauchy–Riemann equations weakly, then f agrees almost everywhere with an analytic function in Ω.

This is in fact a special case of a more general result on the regularity of solutions of hypoelliptic partial differential equations.

=== Several variables ===
There are Cauchy–Riemann equations, appropriately generalized, in the theory of several complex variables. They form a significant overdetermined system of PDEs. This is done using a straightforward generalization of the Wirtinger derivative, where the function in question is required to have the (partial) Wirtinger derivative with respect to each complex variable vanish.

=== Complex differential forms ===
As often formulated, the d-bar operator
$$\bar{\partial}$$
annihilates holomorphic functions. This generalizes most directly the formulation
$${\partial f \over \partial \bar z} = 0,$$
where
$${\partial f \over \partial \bar z} = {1 \over 2}\left({\partial f \over \partial x} + i{\partial f \over \partial y}\right).$$

=== Bäcklund transform ===
Viewed as conjugate harmonic functions, the Cauchy–Riemann equations are a simple example of a Bäcklund transform. More complicated, generally non-linear Bäcklund transforms, such as in the sine-Gordon equation, are of great interest in the theory of solitons and integrable systems.

=== Definition in Clifford algebra ===
In the Clifford algebra $C\ell(2)$, the complex number $z = x+iy$ is represented as $z \equiv x + J y$ where $J \equiv \sigma_1 \sigma_2$, ($\sigma_1^2=\sigma_2^2=1$, $\sigma_1 \sigma_2 + \sigma_2 \sigma_1 = 0$, so $J^2=-1$). The Dirac operator in this Clifford algebra is defined as $\nabla \equiv \sigma_1 \partial_x + \sigma_2\partial_y$. The function $f=u + J v$ is considered analytic if and only if $\nabla f = 0$, which can be calculated in the following way:

$$\begin{align}
0 & =\nabla f= ( \sigma_1 \partial_x + \sigma_2 \partial_y )(u + \sigma_1 \sigma_2 v) \\[4pt]
& =\sigma_1 \partial_x u + \underbrace{\sigma_1 \sigma_1 \sigma_2}_{=\sigma_2} \partial_x v + \sigma_2 \partial_y u + \underbrace{\sigma_2 \sigma_1 \sigma_2}_{=-\sigma_1} \partial_y v =0
\end{align}$$

Grouping by $\sigma_1$ and $\sigma_2$:

$$\nabla f = \sigma_1 ( \partial_x u - \partial_y v) + \sigma_2 ( \partial_x v + \partial_y u) = 0 \Leftrightarrow \begin{cases}
\partial_x u - \partial_y v = 0\\[4pt]
\partial_x v + \partial_y u = 0
\end{cases}$$

Hence, in traditional notation:

$$\begin{cases}
\dfrac{ \partial u }{ \partial x } = \dfrac{ \partial v }{ \partial y }\\[12pt]
\dfrac{ \partial u }{ \partial y } = -\dfrac{ \partial v }{ \partial x }
\end{cases}$$

=== Conformal mappings in higher dimensions ===
Let Ω be an open set in the Euclidean space $\mathbb{R}^n$. The equation for an orientation-preserving mapping $f:\Omega\to\mathbb{R}^n$ to be a conformal mapping (that is, angle-preserving) is that
$$Df^\mathsf{T} Df = (\det(Df))^{2/n}I$$

where Df is the Jacobian matrix, with transpose $Df^\mathsf{T}$, and I denotes the identity matrix. For n = 2, this system is equivalent to the standard Cauchy–Riemann equations of complex variables, and the solutions are holomorphic functions. In dimension n > 2, this is still sometimes called the Cauchy–Riemann system, and Liouville's theorem implies, under suitable smoothness assumptions, that any such mapping is a Möbius transformation.

=== Lie pseudogroups ===
One might seek to generalize the Cauchy-Riemann equations instead by asking more generally when are the solutions of a system of PDEs closed under composition. The theory of Lie Pseudogroups addresses these kinds of questions.

== See also ==
- List of complex analysis topics
- Cauchy integral theorem
- Morera's theorem
- Wirtinger derivatives

== Sources ==
- Gray, J. D.; Morris, S. A. (April 1978). "When is a Function that Satisfies the Cauchy–Riemann Equations Analytic?". The American Mathematical Monthly. 85 (4): 246–256. doi:10.2307/2321164. JSTOR 2321164.
- Looman, H. (1923). "Über die Cauchy–Riemannschen Differentialgleichungen". Göttinger Nachrichten (in German): 97–108.
- Marsden, A; Hoffman, M (1973). Basic complex analysis. W. H. Freeman.
- Rudin, Walter (1966). Real and complex analysis (3rd ed.). McGraw Hill (published 1987). ISBN 0-07-054234-1.
