= Antiholomorphic function =

Function family in complex analysis

In mathematics, antiholomorphic functions (also called antianalytic functions) are a family of functions closely related to but distinct from holomorphic functions.

A function of the complex variable $z$ defined on an open set in the complex plane is said to be antiholomorphic if its derivative with respect to $\bar z$ exists in the neighbourhood of each and every point in that set, where $\bar z$ is the complex conjugate of $z$.

A definition of antiholomorphic function follows:

"[a] function $f(z) = u + i v$ of one or more complex variables $z = \left(z_1, \dots, z_n\right) \in \Complex^n$ [is said to be anti-holomorphic if (and only if) it] is the complex conjugate of a holomorphic function $\overline{f \left(z\right)} = u - i v$."

One can show that if $f(z)$ is a holomorphic function on an open set $D$, then $f(\bar z)$ is an antiholomorphic function on $\bar D$, where $\bar D$ is the reflection of $D$ across the real axis; in other words, $\bar D$ is the set of complex conjugates of elements of $D$. Moreover, any antiholomorphic function can be obtained in this manner from a holomorphic function. This implies that a function is antiholomorphic if and only if it can be expanded in a power series in $\bar z$ in a neighborhood of each point in its domain. Also, a function $f(z)$ is antiholomorphic on an open set $D$ if and only if the function $\overline{f(z)}$ is holomorphic on $D$.

If a function is both holomorphic and antiholomorphic, then it is constant on any connected component of its domain.
