= Polydisc =

Cartesian product of discs

In the theory of functions of several complex variables, a branch of mathematics, a polydisc is a Cartesian product of discs.

More specifically, if we denote by $D(z,r)$ the open disc of center z and radius r in the complex plane, then an open polydisc is a set of the form

$$D(z_1,r_1) \times \dots \times D(z_n,r_n).$$

It can be equivalently written as

$$\{ w=(w_1, w_2, \dots, w_n) \in {\mathbf{C}}^n : \vert z_k - w_k \vert < r_k, \mbox{ for all } k = 1,\dots,n \}.$$

One should not confuse the polydisc with the open ball in C^{n}, which is defined as

$$\{ w \in \mathbf{C}^n : \lVert z - w \rVert < r \}.$$

Here, the norm is the Euclidean distance in C^{n}.

When $n > 1$, open balls and open polydiscs are not biholomorphically equivalent, that is, there is no biholomorphic mapping between the two. This was proven by Poincaré in 1907 by showing that their automorphism groups have different dimensions as Lie groups.

When $n=2$ the term bidisc is sometimes used.

A polydisc is an example of logarithmically convex Reinhardt domain.
