= Simply connected space =

Space which has no holes through it

In topology, a topological space is called simply connected (or 1-connected, or 1-simply connected) if it is path-connected and every path between two points can be continuously transformed into any other such path while preserving the two endpoints in question. Intuitively, this corresponds to a space that has no disjoint parts and no holes that go completely through it, because two paths going around different sides of such a hole cannot be continuously transformed into each other. The fundamental group of a topological space is an indicator of the failure for the space to be simply connected: a path-connected topological space is simply connected if and only if its fundamental group is trivial.

== Definition and equivalent formulations ==
This shape represents a set that is not simply connected, because any loop that encloses one or more of the holes cannot be contracted to a point without exiting the region.

A topological space $X$ is called simply connected if it is path-connected and any loop in $X$ defined by $f : S^1 \to X$ can be contracted to a point: there exists a continuous map $F : D^2 \to X$ such that $F$ restricted to $S^1$ is $f.$ Here, $S^1$ and $D^2$ denotes the unit circle and closed unit disk in the Euclidean plane respectively.

An equivalent formulation is this: $X$ is simply connected if and only if it is path-connected, and whenever $p : [0, 1] \to X$ and $q : [0, 1] \to X$ are two paths (that is, continuous maps) with the same start and endpoint ($p(0) = q(0)$ and $p(1) = q(1)$), then $p$ can be continuously deformed into $q$ while keeping both endpoints fixed. Explicitly, there exists a homotopy $F : [0,1] \times [0,1] \to X$ such that $F(x,0) = p(x)$ and $F(x,1) = q(x).$

A topological space $X$ is simply connected if and only if $X$ is path-connected and the fundamental group of $X$ at each point is trivial, i.e. consists only of the identity element. Similarly, $X$ is simply connected if and only if for all points $x, y \in X,$ the set of morphisms $\operatorname{Hom}_{\Pi(X)}(x,y)$ in the fundamental groupoid of $X$ has only one element.

In complex analysis: an open subset $X \subseteq \Complex$ is simply connected if and only if both $X$ and its complement in the Riemann sphere are connected. The set of complex numbers with imaginary part strictly greater than zero and less than one furnishes an example of an unbounded, connected, open subset of the plane whose complement is not connected. It is nevertheless simply connected. A relaxation of the requirement that $X$ be connected leads to an exploration of open subsets of the plane with connected extended complement. For example, a (not necessarily connected) open set has a connected extended complement exactly when each of its connected components is simply connected.

== Informal discussion ==
Informally, an object in our space is simply connected if it consists of one piece and does not have any "holes" that pass all the way through it. For example, neither a doughnut nor a coffee cup (with a handle) is simply connected, but a hollow rubber ball is simply connected. In two dimensions, a circle is not simply connected, but a disk and a line are. Spaces that are connected but not simply connected are called non-simply connected or multiply connected.

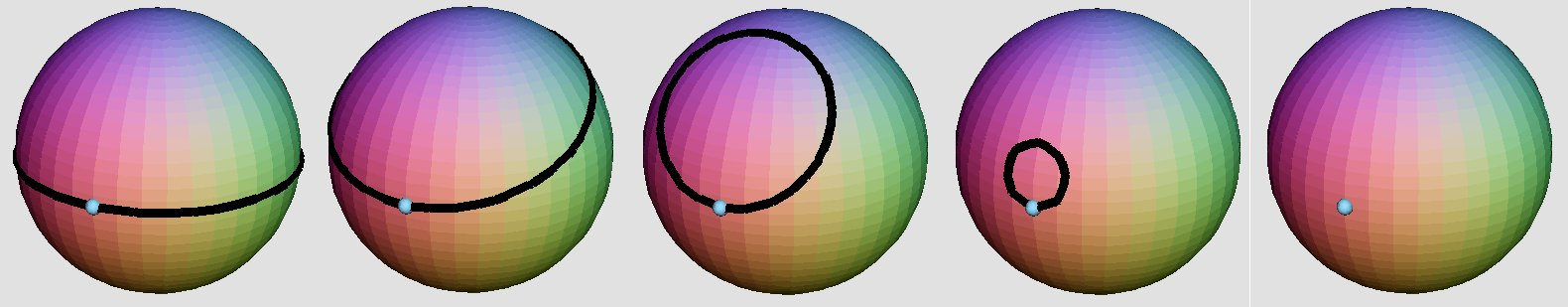
A sphere is simply connected because every loop can be contracted (on the surface) to a point.

The definition rules out only handle-shaped holes. A sphere (or, equivalently, a rubber ball with a hollow center) is simply connected, because any loop on the surface of a sphere can contract to a point even though it has a "hole" in the hollow center. The stronger condition, that the object has no holes of any dimension, is called contractibility.

== Examples ==
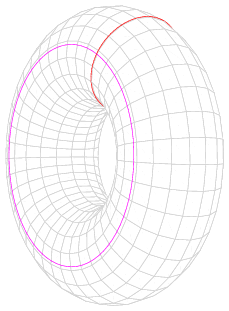
A torus is not a simply connected surface. Neither of the two colored loops shown here can be contracted to a point without leaving the surface. A solid torus is also not simply connected because the purple loop cannot contract to a point without leaving the solid.

- The Euclidean plane $\R^2$ is simply connected, but $\R^2$ minus the origin $(0, 0)$ is not. If $n > 2,$ then both $\R^n$ and $\R^n$ minus the origin are simply connected.
- Analogously: the n-dimensional sphere $S^n$ is simply connected if and only if $n \geq 2.$
- Every convex subset of $\R^n$ is simply connected.
- A torus, the (elliptic) cylinder, the Möbius strip, the projective plane and the Klein bottle are not simply connected.
- Every topological vector space is simply connected; this includes Banach spaces and Hilbert spaces.
- For $n \geq 2,$ the special orthogonal group $\operatorname{SO}(n, \R)$ is not simply connected and the special unitary group $\operatorname{SU}(n)$ is simply connected.
- The one-point compactification of $\R$ is not simply connected (even though $\R$ is simply connected).
- The long line $L$ is simply connected, but its compactification, the extended long line $L^*$ is not (since it is not even path connected).

== Properties ==
A surface (two-dimensional topological manifold) is simply connected if and only if it is connected and its genus (the number of handles of the surface) is 0.

A universal cover of any (suitable) space $X$ is a simply connected space which maps to $X$ via a covering map.

If $X$ and $Y$ are homotopy equivalent and $X$ is simply connected, then so is $Y.$

The image of a simply connected set under a continuous function need not be simply connected. Take for example the complex plane under the exponential map: the image is $\Complex \setminus \{ 0 \},$ which is not simply connected.

The notion of simple connectedness is important in complex analysis because of the following facts:

- Cauchy's integral theorem states that if $U$ is a simply connected open subset of the complex plane $\Complex,$ and $f : U \to \Complex$ is a holomorphic function, then $f$ has an antiderivative $F$ on $U,$ and the value of every line integral in $U$ with integrand $f$ depends only on the end points $u$ and $v$ of the path, and can be computed as $F(v) - F(u).$ The integral thus does not depend on the particular path connecting $u$ and $v,$
- The Riemann mapping theorem states that any non-empty open simply connected subset of $\Complex$ (except for $\Complex$ itself) is conformally equivalent to the unit disk.

The notion of simple connectedness is also a crucial condition in the Poincaré conjecture.

== See also ==
- Deformation retract – Continuous, position-preserving mapping from a topological space into a subspace
- Locally simply connected space
- n-connected space – Topological property
- Unicoherent space – Type of topological space
