= Antiderivative (complex analysis) =

Concept in complex analysis

In complex analysis, a branch of mathematics, the antiderivative, or primitive, of a complex-valued function g is a function whose complex derivative is g. More precisely, given an open set $U$ in the complex plane and a function $g:U\to \mathbb C,$ the antiderivative of $g$ is a function $f:U\to \mathbb C$ that satisfies $\frac{df}{dz}=g$.

As such, this concept is the complex-variable version of the antiderivative of a real-valued function.

== Uniqueness ==
The derivative of a constant function is the zero function. Therefore, any constant function is an antiderivative of the zero function. If $U$ is a connected set, then the constant functions are the only antiderivatives of the zero function. Otherwise, a function is an antiderivative of the zero function if and only if it is constant on each connected component of $U$ (those constants need not be equal).

This observation implies that if a function $g:U\to \mathbb C$ has an antiderivative, then that antiderivative is unique up to addition of a function which is constant on each connected component of $U$.

== Existence ==
By Cauchy's integral formula, which shows that a differentiable function is in fact infinitely differentiable, a function $f$ must itself be differentiable if it has an antiderivative $F$, because if $F'=f$ then $F$ is differentiable and so $F''=f'$ exists.

One can characterize the existence of antiderivatives via path integrals in the complex plane, much like the case of functions of a real variable. Perhaps not surprisingly, g has an antiderivative f if and only if, for every γ path from a to b, the path integral

$$\int_{\gamma} g(\zeta) \, d \zeta = f(b) - f(a).$$

Equivalently,

$$\oint_{\gamma} g(\zeta) \, d \zeta = 0,$$

for any closed path γ.

However, this formal similarity notwithstanding, possessing a complex-antiderivative is a much more restrictive condition than its real counterpart. While it is possible for a discontinuous real function to have an anti-derivative, anti-derivatives can fail to exist even for holomorphic functions of a complex variable. For example, consider the reciprocal function, g(z) = 1/z which is holomorphic on the punctured plane C\{0}. A direct calculation shows that the integral of g along any circle enclosing the origin is non-zero. So g fails the condition cited above. This is similar to the existence of potential functions for conservative vector fields, in that Green's theorem is only able to guarantee path independence when the function in question is defined on a simply connected region, as in the case of the Cauchy integral theorem.

In fact, holomorphy is characterized by having an antiderivative locally, that is, g is holomorphic if for every z in its domain, there is some neighborhood U of z such that g has an antiderivative on U. Furthermore, holomorphy is a necessary condition for a function to have an antiderivative, since the derivative of any holomorphic function is holomorphic.

Various versions of Cauchy integral theorem, an underpinning result of Cauchy function theory, which makes heavy use of path integrals, gives sufficient conditions under which, for a holomorphic g,

$$\oint_{\gamma} g(\zeta) \, d \zeta$$

vanishes for any closed path γ (which may be, for instance, that the domain of g be simply connected or star-convex).

=== Necessity ===
First we show that if f is an antiderivative of g on U, then g has the path integral property given above. Given any piecewise C^{1} path γ : [a, b] → U, one can express the path integral of g over γ as

$$\int_\gamma g(z)\,dz=\int_a^b g(\gamma(t))\gamma'(t)\, dt=\int_a^b f'(\gamma(t))\gamma'(t)\,dt.$$

By the chain rule and the fundamental theorem of calculus one then has

$$\int_\gamma g(z)\,dz=\int_a^b \frac{d}{dt}f\left(\gamma(t)\right)\,dt=f\left(\gamma(b)\right)-f\left(\gamma(a)\right).$$

Therefore, the integral of g over γ does not depend on the actual path γ, but only on its endpoints, which is what we wanted to show.

=== Sufficiency ===
Next we show that if g is holomorphic, and the integral of g over any path depends only on the endpoints, then g has an antiderivative. We will do so by finding an anti-derivative explicitly.

Without loss of generality, we can assume that the domain U of g is connected, as otherwise one can prove the existence of an antiderivative on each connected component. With this assumption, fix a point z_{0} in U and for any z in U define the function

$$f(z)=\int_{\gamma}\! g(\zeta)\, d\zeta$$

where γ is any path joining z_{0} to z. Such a path exists since U is assumed to be an open connected set. The function f is well-defined because the integral depends only on the endpoints of γ.

That this f is an antiderivative of g can be argued in the same way as the real case. We have, for a given z in U, that there must exist a disk centred on z and contained entirely within U. Then for every w other than z within this disk

$$\begin{align}
\left| \frac{f(w) - f(z)}{ w-z } - g(z) \right|&= \left|  \int_z^w \frac{ g(\zeta) \,d\zeta}{w -z} - \int_z^w \frac{ g(z) \,d\zeta}{w -z} \right|\\
&\leq \int_z^w \frac{ | g(\zeta) - g (z) |}{|w -z|} \,d\zeta \\
&\leq \sup_{ \zeta \in [w, z]} | g(\zeta) - g(z) |,
\end{align}$$

where [z, w] denotes the line segment between z and w. By continuity of g, the final expression goes to zero as w approaches z. In other words, f′ = g.
