= Potential theory =

Harmonic functions as solutions to Laplace's equation

In mathematics and mathematical physics, potential theory is the study of harmonic functions.

The term "potential theory" dates from 19th-century physics when it was realized that the two fundamental forces of nature known at the time, namely gravity and the electrostatic force, could be modeled using functions called the gravitational potential and electrostatic potential, both of which satisfy Poisson's equation—or in the vacuum, Laplace's equation.

There is considerable overlap between potential theory and the theory of Poisson's equation to the extent that it is impossible to draw a distinction between these two fields. The difference is more one of emphasis than subject matter and rests on the following distinction: potential theory focuses on the properties of the functions as opposed to the properties of the equation. For example, a result about the singularities of harmonic functions would be said to belong to potential theory whilst a result on how the solution depends on the boundary data would be said to belong to the theory of Poisson's equation. This is not a hard and fast distinction, and in practice there is considerable overlap between the two fields, with methods and results from one being used in the other.

Modern potential theory is also intimately connected with probability and the theory of Markov chains. In the continuous case, this is closely related to analytic theory. In the finite state space case, this connection can be introduced by introducing an electrical network on the state space, with electrical resistance between points inversely proportional to transition probabilities and densities proportional to potentials. Even in the finite case, the analogue I-K of the Laplacian in potential theory has its own maximum principle, uniqueness principle, balance principle, and others.

== Symmetry ==
A useful starting point and organizing principle in the study of harmonic functions is a consideration of the symmetries of the Laplace equation. Although it is not a symmetry in the usual sense of the term, we can start with the observation that the Laplace equation is linear. This means that the fundamental object of study in potential theory is a linear space of functions. This observation will prove especially important when we consider function space approaches to the subject in a later section.

As for symmetry in the usual sense of the term, we may start with the theorem that the symmetries of the $n$-dimensional Laplace equation are exactly the conformal symmetries of the $n$-dimensional Euclidean space. This fact has several implications. First of all, one can consider harmonic functions which transform under irreducible representations of the conformal group or of its subgroups (such as the group of rotations or translations). Proceeding in this fashion, one systematically obtains the solutions of the Laplace equation which arise from separation of variables such as spherical harmonic solutions and Fourier series. By taking linear superpositions of these solutions, one can produce large classes of harmonic functions which can be shown to be dense in the space of all harmonic functions under suitable topologies.

Second, one can use conformal symmetry to understand such classical tricks and techniques for generating harmonic functions as the Kelvin transform and the method of images.

Third, one can use conformal transforms to map harmonic functions in one domain to harmonic functions in another domain. The most common instance of such a construction is to relate harmonic functions on a disk to harmonic functions on a half-plane.

Fourth, one can use conformal symmetry to extend harmonic functions to harmonic functions on conformally flat Riemannian manifolds. Perhaps the simplest such extension is to consider a harmonic function defined on the whole of R^{n} (with the possible exception of a discrete set of singular points) as a harmonic function on the $n$-dimensional sphere. More complicated situations can also happen. For instance, one can obtain a higher-dimensional analog of Riemann surface theory by expressing a multi-valued harmonic function as a single-valued function on a branched cover of R^{n} or one can regard harmonic functions which are invariant under a discrete subgroup of the conformal group as functions on a multiply connected manifold or orbifold.

== Two dimensions ==
From the fact that the group of conformal transforms is infinite-dimensional in two dimensions and finite-dimensional for more than two dimensions, one can surmise that potential theory in two dimensions is different from potential theory in other dimensions. This is correct and, in fact, when one realizes that any two-dimensional harmonic function is the real part of a complex analytic function, one sees that the subject of two-dimensional potential theory is substantially the same as that of complex analysis. For this reason, when speaking of potential theory, one focuses attention on theorems which hold in three or more dimensions. In this connection, a surprising fact is that many results and concepts originally discovered in complex analysis (such as Schwarz's theorem, Morera's theorem, the Weierstrass-Casorati theorem, Laurent series, and the classification of singularities as removable, poles and essential singularities) generalize to results on harmonic functions in any dimension. By considering which theorems of complex analysis are special cases of theorems of potential theory in any dimension, one can obtain a feel for exactly what is special about complex analysis in two dimensions and what is simply the two-dimensional instance of more general results.

== Local behavior ==
An important topic in potential theory is the study of the local behavior of harmonic functions. Perhaps the most fundamental theorem about local behavior is the regularity theorem for Laplace's equation, which states that harmonic functions are analytic. There are results which describe the local structure of level sets of harmonic functions. There is Bôcher's theorem, which characterizes the behavior of isolated singularities of positive harmonic functions. As alluded to in the last section, one can classify the isolated singularities of harmonic functions as removable singularities, poles, and essential singularities.

== Inequalities ==
A fruitful approach to the study of harmonic functions is the consideration of inequalities they satisfy. Perhaps the most basic such inequality, from which most other inequalities may be derived, is the maximum principle. Another important result is Liouville's theorem, which states the only bounded harmonic functions defined on the whole of R^{n} are, in fact, constant functions. In addition to these basic inequalities, one has Harnack's inequality, which states that positive harmonic functions on bounded domains are roughly constant.

One important use of these inequalities is to prove convergence of families of harmonic functions or sub-harmonic functions, see Harnack's theorem. These convergence theorems are used to prove the existence of harmonic functions with particular properties.

== Spaces of harmonic functions ==
Since the Laplace equation is linear, the set of harmonic functions defined on a given domain is, in fact, a vector space. By defining suitable norms and/or inner products, one can exhibit sets of harmonic functions which form Hilbert or Banach spaces. In this fashion, one obtains such spaces as the Hardy space, Bloch space, Bergman space and Sobolev space.

== See also ==
- Subharmonic function – Class of mathematical functions
- Kellogg's theorem
