= Cauchy principal value =

Method for assigning values to integrals

In mathematics, the Cauchy principal value, named after Augustin-Louis Cauchy, is a method for assigning values to certain improper integrals which would otherwise be undefined. In this method, a singularity on an integral interval is avoided by limiting the integral interval to the non-singular domain.

== Formulation ==
Depending on the type of singularity in the integrand f, the Cauchy principal value is defined according to the following rules:

For a singularity at a finite number b
$$\lim_{\varepsilon \to 0^+} \left[\int_a^{b-\varepsilon} f(x) \,\mathrm{d}x + \int_{b+\varepsilon}^c f(x) \,\mathrm{d}x\right]$$
with $a < b < c$ and where b is the difficult point, at which the behavior of the function f is such that
$$\int_a^b f(x) \,\mathrm{d}x = \pm\infty$$
for any $a < b$ and
$$\int_b^c f(x) \,\mathrm{d}x = \mp\infty$$
for any $c > b$. (See plus or minus for the precise use of notations ± and ∓.)
For a singularity at infinity ($\infty$)
$$\lim_{a\to\infty} \int_{-a}^a f(x) \,\mathrm{d}x,$$
where
$$\int_{-\infty}^0 f(x) \,\mathrm{d}x = \pm\infty$$
and
$$\int_0^\infty f(x) \,\mathrm{d}x = \mp\infty.$$

In some cases it is necessary to deal simultaneously with singularities both at a finite number b and at infinity. This is usually done by a limit of the form
$$\lim_{\eta \to 0^+} \lim_{\varepsilon \to 0^+} \left[\int_{b-\frac{1}{\eta}}^{b-\varepsilon} f(x) \,\mathrm{d}x + \int_{b+\varepsilon}^{b+\frac{1}{\eta}} f(x) \,\mathrm{d}x\right].$$
In those cases where the integral may be split into two independent, finite limits,
$$\lim_{\varepsilon\to 0^+} \left|\int_a^{b-\varepsilon} f(x) \,\mathrm{d}x\right| < \infty$$
and
$$\lim_{\eta\to 0^+} \left|\int_{b+\eta}^c f(x) \,\mathrm{d}x\right| < \infty,$$
then the function is integrable in the ordinary sense. The result of the procedure for principal value is the same as the ordinary integral; since it no longer matches the definition, it is technically not a "principal value". The Cauchy principal value can also be defined in terms of contour integrals of a complex-valued function $f(z) : z = x + iy,$ with $x, y \in \mathbb{R},$ with a pole on a contour C. Define $C(\varepsilon)$ to be that same contour, where the portion inside the disk of radius ε around the pole has been removed. Provided the function $f(z)$ is integrable over $C(\varepsilon)$ no matter how small ε becomes, then the Cauchy principal value is the limit:
$$\operatorname{p.\!v.} \int_C f(z) \,\mathrm{d}z = \lim_{\varepsilon \to 0^+} \int_{C(\varepsilon)} f(z) \,\mathrm{d}z.$$
In the case of Lebesgue-integrable functions, that is, functions which are integrable in absolute value, these definitions coincide with the standard definition of the integral. If the function $f(z)$ is meromorphic, the Sokhotski–Plemelj theorem relates the principal value of the integral over C with the mean-value of the integrals with the contour displaced slightly above and below, so that the residue theorem can be applied to those integrals. Principal value integrals play a central role in the discussion of Hilbert transforms.

== Distribution theory ==
Let ${C_{c}^{\infty}}(\mathbb{R})$ be the set of test functions, i.e., the space of smooth functions with compact support on the real line $\mathbb{R}$. Then the map
$$\operatorname{p.\!v.} \left( \frac{1}{x} \right) \,:\, {C_{c}^{\infty}}(\mathbb{R}) \to \mathbb{C}$$
defined via the Cauchy principal value as
$$\left[ \operatorname{p.\!v.} \left( \frac{1}{x} \right) \right](u) = \lim_{\varepsilon \to 0^{+}} \int_{\mathbb{R} \setminus [- \varepsilon,\varepsilon]} \frac{u(x)}{x} \, \mathrm{d} x = \lim_{\varepsilon \to 0^{+}} \int_{\varepsilon}^{+ \infty} \frac{u(x) - u(- x)}{x} \, \mathrm{d} x \quad \text{for } u \in {C_{c}^{\infty}}(\mathbb{R})$$
is a distribution. The map itself may sometimes be called the principal value (hence the notation p.v.). This distribution appears, for example, in the Fourier transform of the sign function and the Heaviside step function.

=== Well-definedness as a distribution ===
To prove the existence of the limit
$$\lim_{\varepsilon \to 0^{+}} \int_{\varepsilon}^{+ \infty} \frac{u(x) - u(- x)}{x} \, \mathrm{d}x$$
for a Schwartz function $u(x)$, first observe that $\frac{u(x) - u(-x)}{x}$ is continuous on $[0, \infty),$ as
$$\lim_{\,x \searrow 0\,} \; \Bigl[ u(x) - u(-x) \Bigr] ~= ~0 ~$$
and hence
$$\lim_{x\searrow 0} \, \frac{u(x) - u(-x)}{x} ~=~ \lim_{\,x\searrow 0\,} \, \frac{u'(x) + u'(-x)}{1} ~=~ 2u'(0)~,$$
since $u'(x)$ is continuous and L'Hopital's rule applies.

Therefore, $\int_0^1 \, \frac{u(x) - u(-x)}{x} \, \mathrm{d}x$ exists and by applying the mean value theorem to $u(x) - u(-x) ,$ we get:

$$\left|\, \int_0^1\,\frac{u(x) - u(-x)}{x} \,\mathrm{d}x \,\right|
\;\leq\; \int_0^1 \frac{\bigl|u(x)-u(-x)\bigr|}{x} \,\mathrm{d}x
\;\leq\; \int_0^1\,\frac{\,2x\,}{x}\,\sup_{x \in [-1, 1] }\,\Bigl|u'(x)\Bigr| \,\mathrm{d}x
\;\leq\; 2\,\sup_{x \in [-1, 1] }\,\Bigl|u'(x)\Bigr| ~.$$

And furthermore:

$$\left| \,\int_1^\infty \frac {\;u(x) - u(-x)\;}{x} \,\mathrm{d}x \,\right| \;\leq\; 2 \,\sup_{x\in\mathbb{R}} \,\Bigl|x\cdot u(x)\Bigr|~\cdot\;\int_1^\infty \frac{\mathrm{d}x}{\,x^2\,} \;=\; 2 \,\sup_{x\in\mathbb{R}}\, \Bigl|x \cdot u(x)\Bigr| ~,$$

we note that the map
$$\operatorname{p.v.}\;\left( \frac{1}{\,x\,} \right) \,:\, {C_{c}^{\infty}}(\mathbb{R}) \to \mathbb{C}$$
is bounded by the usual seminorms for Schwartz functions $u$. Therefore, this map defines, as it is obviously linear, a continuous functional on the Schwartz space and therefore a tempered distribution.

Note that the proof needs $u$ merely to be continuously differentiable in a neighbourhood of 0 and $x\,u$ to be bounded towards infinity. The principal value therefore is defined on even weaker assumptions such as $u$ integrable with compact support and differentiable at 0.

=== More general definitions ===
The principal value is the inverse distribution of the function $x$ and is almost the only distribution with this property:
$$x f = 1 \quad \Leftrightarrow \quad \exists K: \; \; f = \operatorname{p.\!v.} \left( \frac{1}{x} \right) + K \delta,$$
where $K$ is a constant and $\delta$ the Dirac distribution.

In a broader sense, the principal value can be defined for a wide class of singular integral kernels on the Euclidean space $\mathbb{R}^{n}$. If $K$ has an isolated singularity at the origin, but is an otherwise "nice" function, then the principal-value distribution is defined on compactly supported smooth functions by
$$[\operatorname{p.\!v.} (K)](f) = \lim_{\varepsilon \to 0} \int_{\mathbb{R}^{n} \setminus B_{\varepsilon}(0)} f(x) K(x) \, \mathrm{d} x.$$
Such a limit may not be well defined, or, being well-defined, it may not necessarily define a distribution. It is, however, well-defined if $K$ is a continuous homogeneous function of degree $-n$ whose integral over any sphere centered at the origin vanishes. This is the case, for instance, with the Riesz transforms.

== Examples ==
Consider the values of two limits:
$$\lim_{a \to 0+}\left(\int_{-1}^{-a}\frac{\mathrm{d}x}{x} + \int_a^1\frac{\mathrm{d}x}{x}\right)=0,$$

This is the Cauchy principal value of the otherwise ill-defined expression
$$\int_{-1}^1\frac{\mathrm{d}x}{x}, \text{ (which gives } {-\infty}+\infty \text{)}.$$

Similarly, we have
$$\lim_{a \to \infty}\int_{-a}^a\frac{2x\,\mathrm{d}x}{x^2+1}=0,$$

This is the principal value of the otherwise ill-defined expression
$$\int_{-\infty}^\infty\frac{2x\,\mathrm{d}x}{x^2+1} \text{ (which gives } {-\infty}+\infty \text{)}.$$

== Notation ==
Different authors use different notations for the Cauchy principal value of a function $f$, among others:
$$PV \int f(x)\,\mathrm{d}x,$$
$$\mathrm{p.v.} \int f(x)\,\mathrm{d}x,$$
$$\int_L^*  f(z)\, \mathrm{d}z,$$
$$-\!\!\!\!\!\!\int f(x)\,\mathrm{d}x,$$
as well as $P,$ P.V., $\mathcal{P},$ $P_v,$ $(CPV),$ $\mathcal{C},$ and V.P.

== See also ==
- Hadamard finite part integral
- Hilbert transform
- Sokhotski–Plemelj theorem
