= Edward Collingwood =

English mathematician

Sir Edward Collingwood
- Photo courtesy of Mathematical Research Institute of Oberwolfach
- Born: Edward Foyle Collingwood; 17 January 1900; Lilburn Tower
- Died: 25 October 1970 (aged 70); Lilburn Tower
- Education: Trinity College, Cambridge
- Awards: Fellow of the Royal Society (1965); CBE; Knight Bachelor (1962); FRSE; DL
- Scientific career
- Workplaces: University of Cambridge; Aberystwyth University; Durham University; University of Paris
- Thesis: Contributions to the Theory of Integral Functions (1929)
- Academic advisors: John Edensor Littlewood

Sir Edward Foyle Collingwood CBE FRS FRSE DL LLD (17 January 1900 – 25 October 1970) was an English mathematician and scientist. He was a member of the Eglingham branch of a prominent Northumbrian family, the son of Col. Cuthbert Collingwood of the Lancashire Fusiliers, whose family seat was at Lilburn Tower, near Wooler, Northumberland. His great grandfather was a brother of Admiral Lord Collingwood.

== Life ==
Collingwood was born at his family home, Lilburn Tower, near Wooler in Northumberland, the son of Col. Cuthbert George Collingwood and his wife, Dorothy Fawcett.

Collingwood was educated at the Royal Naval College, Osborne, on the Isle of Wight and at Dartmouth Royal Naval College and was commissioned into the Royal Navy. By arrangement his first service was aboard the dreadnought battleship HMS Collingwood but his naval career was cut short during World War I when in 1916 he was invalided out of the Navy following an accidental injury.

In 1918 he enrolled to study mathematics at Trinity College, Cambridge. His early academic results were not special and in 1922 he moved to Aberystwyth University where he became interested in complex analysis and published a paper relating to Nevanlinna's theory. He was awarded the Rayleigh Prize in 1923 and following the award of the Rouse Ball travelling scholarship in 1925 he spent a year at the University of Paris.

Collingwood returned to Cambridge and was in 1929 awarded a doctorate for a thesis entitled Contributions to the theory of integral functions. Collingwood left Cambridge in 1937 when he was appointed High Sheriff of Northumberland for that year. He was later appointed Deputy Lieutenant of his home county.

During World War II he served in the RNVR with the rank of Captain and was employed as a naval scientist. In 1945 he was appointed Chief Scientist in the Mine Design department of the Admiralty. For his service he was awarded the CBE.

Collingwood returned to mathematics after the war and continued his interest in meromorphic functions and in 1949 published his research on the theory of cluster sets.

== Awards and honours ==
Collingwood was elected a fellow of the Royal Society of Edinburgh in 1954 and of the Royal Society of London in 1965. He held several professional and civic appointments including President of the London Mathematical Society 1969–70, Chairman of the Council of Durham University from 1953, Chairman of the Newcastle Hospital Board 1953–1968, Vice President of the International Hospital Federation 1959-1967 and Treasurer of the Medical Research Council.

He was knighted in 1962.

== Family ==
Collingwood never married.
