= Value distribution theory of holomorphic functions =

Division of mathematical analysis

In mathematics, the value distribution theory of holomorphic functions is a division of mathematical analysis. The purpose of the theory is to provide quantitative measures of the number of times a function f(z) assumes a value a, as z grows in size, refining the Picard theorem on behaviour close to an essential singularity. The theory exists for analytic functions (and meromorphic functions) of one complex variable z, or of several complex variables.

In the case of one variable, the term Nevanlinna theory, after Rolf Nevanlinna, is also common. The now-classical theory received renewed interest when Paul Vojta suggested some analogies to the problem of integral solutions to Diophantine equations. These turned out to involve some close parallels and to lead to fresh points of view on the Mordell conjecture and related questions.
