= Principle value =

Principle value may refer to:

- Principle value (ethics)
- Cauchy principal value (mathematics)
