= Liouville's theorem (complex analysis) =

Theorem in complex analysis

In complex analysis, Liouville's theorem states that every bounded entire function must be constant. That is, every holomorphic function $f$ for which there exists a positive number $M$ such that $|f(z)| \leq M$ for all $z\in\Complex$ is constant. Equivalently, non-constant holomorphic functions on $\Complex$ have unbounded images.

The theorem is named after Joseph Liouville, although the theorem was first proven by Cauchy in 1844. The theorem is considerably improved by Picard's little theorem, which says that every entire function whose image omits two or more complex numbers must be constant.

== Statement ==
Liouville's theorem: Every holomorphic function $f:\mathbb C \to \mathbb C$ for which there exists a positive number $M$ such that $|f(z)| \leq M$ for all $z\in\Complex$ is constant.

More succinctly, Liouville's theorem states that every bounded entire function must be constant.

== Proof ==
This important theorem has several proofs.

A standard analytical proof uses the fact that holomorphic functions are analytic.

Proof

If $f$ is an entire function, it can be represented by its Taylor series about 0:

$$f(z) = \sum_{k=0}^\infty a_k z^k$$

where (by Cauchy's integral formula)

$$a_k = \frac{f^{(k)}(0)}{k!} = {1 \over 2 \pi i} \oint_{C_r} \frac{f( \zeta )}{\zeta^{k+1}}\,d\zeta$$

and $C_r$ is the circle about 0 of radius $r > 0$. Suppose $f$ is bounded: i.e. there exists a constant $M$ such that $|f(z)|\leq M$ for all $z$. We can estimate directly

$$| a_k |
\le \frac{1}{2 \pi} \oint_{C_r} \frac{ | f ( \zeta ) | }{ | \zeta |^{k+1} } \, |d\zeta|
\le \frac{1}{2 \pi} \oint_{C_r} \frac{ M }{ r^{k+1} } \, |d\zeta|
= \frac{M}{2 \pi r^{k+1}} \oint_{C_r} |d\zeta|
= \frac{M}{2 \pi r^{k+1}} 2 \pi r
= \frac{M}{r^k},$$

where in the second inequality we have used the fact that $|z|=r$ on the circle $C_r$. (This estimate is known as Cauchy's estimate.) But the choice of $r$ in the above is an arbitrary positive number. Therefore, letting $r$ tend to infinity (we let $r$ tend to infinity since $f$ is analytic on the entire plane) gives $a_k=0$ for all $k\geq 1$. Thus $f(z)=a_0$ and this proves the theorem.

Another proof uses the mean value property of harmonic functions.

Proof

Given two points, choose two balls with the given points as centers and of equal radius. If the radius is large enough, the two balls will coincide except for an arbitrarily small proportion of their volume. Since $f$ is bounded, the averages of it over the two balls are arbitrarily close, and so $f$ assumes the same value at any two points.

The proof can be adapted to the case where the harmonic function $f$ is merely bounded above or below. See Harmonic function#Liouville's theorem.

Another approach to prove the theorem is

Proof

Suppose $|f(z)| \leq M$ for all $z$ in the complex plane, we can apply the Cauchy estimate to a disk center at any $z_0$ of any radius $\rho$ to obtain: $|f'(z_0)| \leq \frac{M}{\rho}$.

Let $\rho$ tend to $+\infty$, we obtain $f'(z_0) = 0$. Since This is true for all $z_0$, $f(z)$ is a constant.

== Corollaries ==
=== Fundamental theorem of algebra ===
There is a short proof of the fundamental theorem of algebra using Liouville's theorem.

Proof (Fundamental theorem of algebra)

Suppose for the sake of contradiction that there is a nonconstant polynomial $p$ with no complex root. Note that $|p(z)| \to \infty$ as $z \to \infty$. Then for sufficiently large R we have $|p(z)| > 1$ for all $z \not\in B(0,R)$.

Because $p$ has no roots, the function $q(z) = 1/p(z)$ is entire, and holomorphic inside $B(0, R)$, and thus it is also continuous on its closure $\overline B(0, R)$. By the extreme value theorem, a continuous function on a closed and bounded set obtains its extreme values, implying that $1/|p(z)| \le C$ for some constant $C$ and $z \in \overline B(0, R)$.

Thus, the function $q(z)$ is bounded in $\mathbb C$, and by Liouville's theorem, is constant, which contradicts our assumption that $p$ is nonconstant.

=== No entire function dominates another entire function ===
A consequence of the theorem is that "genuinely different" entire functions cannot dominate each other, i.e. if $f$ and $g$ are entire, and $|f|\leq |g|$ everywhere, then $f=\alpha g$ for some complex number $\alpha$. Consider that for $g=0$ the theorem is trivial so we assume $g\neq 0$. Consider the function $h=f/g$. It is enough to prove that $h$ can be extended to an entire function, in which case the result follows by Liouville's theorem. The holomorphy of $h$ is clear except at points in $g^{-1}(0)$. But since $h$ is bounded and all the zeroes of $g$ are isolated, any singularities must be removable. Thus $h$ can be extended to an entire bounded function which by Liouville's theorem implies it is constant.

=== If f is less than or equal to a scalar times its input, then it is linear ===
Suppose that $f$ is entire and $|f(z)|\leq M|z|$, for $M>0$. We can apply Cauchy's integral formula; we have that

$$|f'(z)|=\frac{1}{2\pi}\left|\oint_{C_r}\frac{f(\zeta)}{(\zeta-z)^2}d\zeta\right|\leq \frac{1}{2\pi} \oint_{C_r} \frac{|f(\zeta)|}{\left|(\zeta-z)^2\right|} |d \zeta|\leq \frac{1}{2\pi} \oint_{C_r} \frac{M |\zeta|}{\left| (\zeta-z)^2\right|} \left|d\zeta\right|=\frac{MI}{2\pi}$$

where $I$ is the value of the remaining integral. This shows that $f'$ is bounded and entire, so it must be constant, by Liouville's theorem. Integrating then shows that $f$ is affine and then, by referring back to the original inequality, we have that the constant term is zero.

=== Non-constant elliptic functions cannot be defined on the complex plane ===
The theorem can also be used to deduce that the domain of a non-constant elliptic function $f$ cannot be $\Complex$. Suppose it was. Then, if $a$ and $b$ are two periods of $f$ such that $\tfrac{a}{b}$ is not real, consider the parallelogram $P$ whose vertices are 0, $a$, $b$, and $a+b$. Then the image of $f$ is equal to $f(P)$. Since $f$ is continuous and $P$ is compact, $f(P)$ is also compact and, therefore, it is bounded. So, $f$ is constant.

The fact that the domain of a non-constant elliptic function $f$ cannot be $\Complex$ is what Liouville actually proved, in 1847, using the theory of elliptic functions. In fact, it was Cauchy who proved Liouville's theorem.

=== Entire functions have dense images ===
If $f$ is a non-constant entire function, then its image is dense in $\Complex$. This might seem to be a much stronger result than Liouville's theorem, but it is actually an easy corollary. If the image of $f$ is not dense, then there is a complex number $w$ and a real number $r > 0$ such that the open disk centered at $w$ with radius $r$ has no element of the image of $f$. Define

$$g(z) = \frac{1}{f(z) - w}.$$

Then $g$ is a bounded entire function, since for all $z$,

$$|g(z)|=\frac{1}{|f(z)-w|} < \frac{1}{r}.$$

So, $g$ is constant, and therefore $f$ is constant.

== On compact Riemann surfaces ==
Any holomorphic function on a compact Riemann surface is necessarily constant.

Let $f(z)$ be holomorphic on a compact Riemann surface $M$. By compactness, there is a point $p_0 \in M$ where $|f(p)|$ attains its maximum. Then we can find a chart from a neighborhood of $p_0$ to the unit disk $\mathbb{D}$ such that $f(\varphi^{-1}(z))$ is holomorphic on the unit disk and has a maximum at $\varphi(p_0) \in \mathbb{D}$, so it is constant, by the maximum modulus principle.

== Remarks ==
Let $\Complex \cup \{\infty\}$ be the one-point compactification of the complex plane $\Complex$. In place of holomorphic functions defined on regions in $\Complex$, one can consider regions in $\Complex \cup \{\infty\}$. Viewed this way, the only possible singularity for entire functions, defined on $\Complex \subset \Complex \cup \{\infty\}$, is the point $\infty$. If an entire function $f$ is bounded in a neighborhood of $\infty$, then $\infty$ is a removable singularity of $f$, i.e. $f$ cannot blow up or behave erratically at $\infty$. In light of the power series expansion, it is not surprising that Liouville's theorem holds.

Similarly, if an entire function has a pole of order $n$ at $\infty$ —that is, it grows in magnitude comparably to $z^n$ in some neighborhood of $\infty$ —then $f$ is a polynomial. This extended version of Liouville's theorem can be more precisely stated: if $|f(z)|\leq M|z|^n$ for $|z|$ sufficiently large, then $f$ is a polynomial of degree at most $n$. This can be proved as follows. Again take the Taylor series representation of $f$,

$$f(z) = \sum_{k=0}^\infty a_k z^k.$$

The argument used during the proof using Cauchy estimates shows that for all $k\geq 0$,

$$|a_k| \leq Mr^{n-k}.$$

So, if $k > n$, then

$$|a_k| \leq \lim_{r\to\infty}Mr^{n-k} = 0.$$

Therefore, $a_k = 0$.

Liouville's theorem does not extend to the generalizations of complex numbers known as double numbers and dual numbers.

== See also ==
- Mittag-Leffler's theorem
