= Lacunary value =

Number not in the image of a given function

In complex analysis, a subfield of mathematics, a lacunary value or gap of a complex-valued function defined on a subset of the complex plane is a complex number which is not in the image of the function.

More specifically, given a subset X of the complex plane C and a function f : X → C, a complex number z is called a lacunary value of f if z ∉ image(f).

Note, for example, that 0 is the only lacunary value of the complex exponential function. The two Picard theorems limit the number of possible lacunary values of certain types of holomorphic functions.
