= Sokhotski–Plemelj theorem =

Complex analysis theorem

The Sokhotski–Plemelj theorem (Polish spelling is Sochocki) is a theorem in complex analysis, which helps in evaluating certain integrals. The real-line version of it (see below) is often used in physics, although rarely referred to by name. The theorem is named after Julian Sochocki, who proved it in 1868, and Josip Plemelj, who rediscovered it as a main ingredient of his solution of the Riemann–Hilbert problem in 1908.

== Statement of the theorem ==
Let $C$ be a smooth closed simple curve in the plane, and $\varphi$ an analytic function on $C$. Note that the Cauchy-type integral

$$\phi(z) = \frac{1}{2\pi i} \int_C\frac{\varphi(\zeta) \, d\zeta}{\zeta-z},$$

cannot be evaluated for any $z$ on the curve $C$. However, on the interior and exterior of the curve, the integral produces analytic functions, which will be denoted $\phi_i$ inside $C$ and $\phi_e$ outside. The Sokhotski–Plemelj formulas relate the limiting boundary values of these two analytic functions at a point $z$ on $C$ and the Cauchy principal value $\mathcal{P}$ of the integral:

$$\lim_{w \to z}\phi_i(w) = \frac{1}{2\pi i}\mathcal{P}\int_C\frac{\varphi(\zeta) \, d\zeta}{\zeta-z} + \frac{1}{2}\varphi(z),$$

$$\lim_{w \to z}\phi_e(w) = \frac{1}{2\pi i}\mathcal{P}\int_C\frac{\varphi(\zeta) \, d\zeta}{\zeta-z}-\frac{1}{2}\varphi(z).$$

Subsequent generalizations relax the smoothness requirements on curve $C$ and the function $\varphi$.

== Version for the real line ==
Especially important is the version for integrals over the real line.

$$\lim_{\varepsilon\to0^{+}} \frac{1}{x\pm i\varepsilon}= \mp i\pi\delta(x) + {\mathcal{P}} {\Big(\frac{1}{x}\Big)}.$$

where $\delta(x)$ is the Dirac delta function where $\mathcal{P}$ denotes the Cauchy principal value. One may take the difference of these two equalities to obtain

$$\lim_{\varepsilon \to 0^+} \left[ \frac{1}{x-i\varepsilon} - \frac{1}{x+i\varepsilon} \right] = 2\pi i \delta(x).$$

These formulae should be interpreted as integral equalities, as follows: Let $f$ be a complex-valued function which is defined and continuous on the real line, and let $a$ and $b$ be real constants with $a < 0 < b$. Then

$$\lim_{\varepsilon\to 0^+} \int_a^b \frac{f(x)}{x\pm i \varepsilon}\,dx = \mp i \pi f(0) + \mathcal{P}\int_a^b \frac{f(x)}{x}\, dx$$

and

$$\lim_{\varepsilon \to 0^+ } \int_a^b \left[ \frac{f(x)}{x- i \varepsilon} - \frac{f(x)}{x+ i \varepsilon} \right] \, dx = 2 \pi i f(0)$$

Note that this version makes no use of analyticity.

== Proof of the real version ==
A simple proof is as follows.

$$\lim_{\varepsilon\to 0^+} \int_a^b \frac{f(x)}{x\pm i \varepsilon}\,dx = \mp i \pi \lim_{\varepsilon\to 0^+} \int_a^b \frac{\varepsilon}{\pi(x^2+\varepsilon^2)}f(x)\,dx + \lim_{\varepsilon\to 0^+} \int_a^b \frac{x^2}{x^2+\varepsilon^2} \, \frac{f(x)}{x}\, dx.$$

For the first term, $\frac{\varepsilon}{\pi(x^2 + \varepsilon^2)}$ is a nascent delta function, and therefore approaches a Dirac delta function in the limit. Therefore, the first term equals $\mp i \pi f(0)$.

For the second term, the factor $\frac{x^2}{x^2 + \varepsilon^2}$ approaches 1 for $|x| \gg \varepsilon$, approaches 0 for $|x| \ll \varepsilon$, and is exactly symmetric about 0. Therefore, in the limit, it turns the integral into a Cauchy principal value integral.

== Physics application ==
In quantum mechanics and quantum field theory, one often has to evaluate integrals of the form

$$\int_{-\infty}^\infty dE\, \int_0^\infty dt\, f(E)\exp(-iEt)$$

where E is some energy and t is time. This expression, as written, is undefined (since the time integral does not converge), so it is typically modified by adding a negative real term to -iEt in the exponential, and then taking that to zero, i.e.:

$$\begin{align} & \lim_{\varepsilon\to 0^+} \int_{-\infty}^\infty dE\, \int_0^\infty dt\, f(E)\exp(-iEt-\varepsilon t )= \\ & -i \lim_{\varepsilon\to 0^+} \int_{-\infty}^\infty \frac{f(E)}{E-i\varepsilon}\,dE  = \pi f(0)-i \mathcal{P}\int_{-\infty}^{\infty} \frac{f(E)}{E}\,dE,\end{align}$$

where the latter step uses the real version of the theorem.

=== Heitler function ===
In theoretical quantum optics, the derivation of a master equation in Lindblad form often requires the following integral function, which is a direct consequence of the Sokhotski–Plemelj theorem and is often called the Heitler-function:

$$\int_0^\infty d\tau\, \exp(-i(\omega \pm \nu)\tau) = \pi \delta(\omega \pm \nu) - i \mathcal{P} \Big(\frac{1}{\omega \pm \nu}\Big)$$

== See also ==
- Singular integral operators on closed curves (account of the Sokhotski–Plemelj theorem for the unit circle and a closed Jordan curve)
- Kramers–Kronig relations
- Hilbert transform

== Literature ==
- Weinberg, Steven (1995). The Quantum Theory of Fields, Volume 1: Foundations. Cambridge Univ. Press. ISBN 0-521-55001-7. Chapter 3.1.
- Merzbacher, Eugen (1998). Quantum Mechanics. Wiley, John & Sons, Inc. ISBN 0-471-88702-1. Appendix A, equation (A.19).
- Henrici, Peter (1986). Applied and Computational Complex Analysis, vol. 3. Willey, John & Sons, Inc.
- Plemelj, Josip (1964). Problems in the sense of Riemann and Klein. New York: Interscience Publishers.
- Gakhov, F. D. (1990), Boundary value problems. Reprint of the 1966 translation, Dover Publications, ISBN 0-486-66275-6
- Muskhelishvili, N. I. (1949). Singular integral equations, boundary problems of function theory and their application to mathematical physics. Melbourne: Dept. of Supply and Development, Aeronautical Research Laboratories.
- Blanchard, Bruening: Mathematical Methods in Physics (Birkhauser 2003), Example 3.3.1 4
- Sokhotskii, Y. W. (1873). On definite integrals and functions used in series expansions. St. Petersburg.
