= Julian Sochocki =

Polish-Russian mathematician (1842–1927)

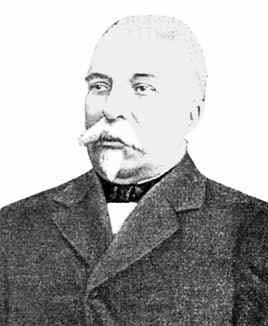
- Sochocki, before 1927
- Born: February 2, 1842; Warsaw, Congress Poland, Russian Empire
- Died: December 14, 1927 (aged 85); Leningrad, Russian SFSR, Soviet Union
- Education: St Petersburg University
- Known for: Sokhotski–Plemelj theorem Casorati–Sokhotski–Weierstrass theorem number theory
- Scientific career
- Fields: Mathematics
- Thesis: On Certain Integrals and Functions Used in Series Expansions (1873)
- Doctoral students: Władysław Natanson

Julian Karol Sochocki (Polish: Julian Karol Sochocki; Russian: Юлиан Васильевич Сохоцкий; February 2, 1842 – December 14, 1927) was a Polish-Russian mathematician and a professor at Saint Petersburg University. He is known for his work in complex analysis and number theory. His name is sometimes transliterated from Russian in several different ways (e.g. Sokhotski or Sochotski).

== Life and work ==
Sochocki was born on 2 February 1842 in Warsaw, Congress Poland, Russian Empire, to a Polish family of Bazyli Sochocki and Józefa (née Lewandowska), where he attended state gymnasium. In 1860, he registered at the Physico-Mathematical Department of St Petersburg University. His study there was interrupted for the period 1860–1865 because of his involvement with Polish patriotic movement: he had to return to Warsaw to escape prosecution.

In 1866, he graduated from the Department of Physics and Mathematics at the University of Saint Petersburg. In 1868, he received his master's degree. In 1873, Sochocki obtained his doctorate based on his thesis entitled On Certain Integrals and Functions Used in Series Expansions (in Russian).

His master's dissertation, practically the first text in Russian mathematical literature on Cauchy method of residues, was published in 1868. The dissertation itself contains many original grasps, which have been also ascribed to other mathematicians. His doctoral thesis contains the famous Sokhotski–Plemelj theorem.

From 1868 Sochotcki lectured at the St Petersburg university, first as the "privat-docent", from 1882 as an ordinary professor, and from 1893 as a merited professor. In 1894, he was elected corresponding member of the Polish Academy of Arts and Sciences.

His notable students included Władysław Natanson, Andrzej Pszenicki, Leon Staniewicz, and Wiktor Staniewicz.

Sochocki died on December 14, 1927, in a nursing home in Leningrad.

Sochocki is mainly remembered for the Casorati–Sokhotski–Weierstrass theorem and for the Sokhotski–Plemelj theorem.

== Selected publications ==
- Теорiя интегральныхъ вычетовъ с нѣкоторыми приложенiями (A Theory of Integral Residues with Some Applications) (1868)
- Объ определенныхъ интегралахъ и функцiяхъ употребляемыхъ при разложенiяхъ въ ряды (On Definite Integrals and Functions Used in Series Expansions) (1873)
- О суммахъ Гаусса и о законе взаимности символа Лежандра (On Gauss Sums and the Reciprocity Law of the Legendre Symbol) (1877)
- Высшая алгебра (Higher Algebra) (St. Petersburg, 1882)
- Теорiя чиселъ (Number Theory) (St. Petersburg, 1888)
- Начало общего наибольшего делителя въ применении к теорiи делимости алгебраическихъ чиселъ (The Principle of the Greatest Common Divisor Applied to Divisibility Theory of Algebraic Numbers) (1893), JFM 25.0300.01, JFM 25.0297.04

== Sources ==
- "Сохоцкий, Юлиан Васильевич" . Brockhaus and Efron Encyclopedic Dictionary (in Russian). 1906.
