= Isolated singularity =

Has no other singularities close to it

In complex analysis, a branch of mathematics, an isolated singularity is one that has no other singularities close to it. In other words, a complex number $z_0$ is an isolated singularity of a function $f$ if there exists an open disk $D$ centered at $z_0$ such that f is holomorphic on $D \smallsetminus \{z_0\}$, that is, on the set obtained from $D$ by removing $z_0$ .

Formally, and within the general scope of general topology, an isolated singularity of a holomorphic function $f: \Omega\to \mathbb {C}$ is any isolated point of the boundary $\partial \Omega$ of the domain $\Omega$. In other words, if $U$ is an open subset of $\mathbb {C}$, $a\in U$ and $f: U\smallsetminus \{a\}\to \mathbb {C}$ is a holomorphic function, then $a$ is an isolated singularity of $f$.

Every singularity of a meromorphic function on an open subset $U\subset \mathbb{C}$ is isolated, but isolation of singularities alone is not sufficient to guarantee a function is meromorphic. Many important tools of complex analysis such as Laurent series and the residue theorem require that all relevant singularities of the function be isolated. Isolated singularities may be classified into three distinct types: removable singularities, poles and essential singularities.

== Examples ==
- The function $\textstyle \frac{1}{z}$ has $0$ as an isolated singularity.
- The cosecant function $\csc \left(\pi z\right)$ has every integer as an isolated singularity.

== Nonisolated singularities ==
Other than isolated singularities, complex functions of one variable may exhibit other singular behavior. Namely, two kinds of nonisolated singularities exist:

- Cluster points, i.e. limit points of isolated singularities: if they are all poles, despite admitting Laurent series expansions on each of them, no such expansion is possible at its limit.
- Natural boundaries, i.e. any non-isolated set (e.g. a curve) around which functions cannot be analytically continued (or outside them if they are closed curves in the Riemann sphere).

=== Examples ===
The natural boundary of this power series is the unit circle (read examples).

- The function $\tan\left(\frac{1}{z}\right)$ is meromorphic on $\mathbb{C}\smallsetminus\{0\}$, with simple poles at $\textstyle z_n = \left(\frac{\pi}{2}+n\pi\right)^{-1}$, for every $n\in\mathbb{N}_0$. Since $z_n\rightarrow 0$, every punctured disk centered at $0$ has an infinite number of singularities within it, so no Laurent expansion is available for $\textstyle \tan\left(\frac{1}{z}\right)$ around $0$, which is in fact a cluster point of its poles.
- The function $\textstyle \csc \left(\frac {\pi} {z}\right)$ has a singularity at $0$ that is not isolated, since there are additional singularities at the reciprocal of every integer, which are located arbitrarily close to $0$ (though the singularities at these reciprocals are themselves isolated).
- The function defined via the Maclaurin series $\textstyle \sum_{n=0}^{\infty}z^{2^n}$ converges inside the open unit disk centred at $0$ and has the unit circle as its natural boundary.
