= Hadamard regularization =

Mathematical method extending convergence

In mathematics, Hadamard regularization (also called Hadamard finite part or Hadamard's partie finie) is a method of regularizing divergent integrals by dropping some divergent terms and keeping the finite part, introduced by Jacques Hadamard (1923, book III, chapter I, 1932). Marcel Riesz (1938, 1949) showed that this can be interpreted as taking the meromorphic continuation of a convergent integral.

== Description ==
If the Cauchy principal value integral
$$\mathcal{C}\int_a^b \frac{f(t)}{t-x} \, dt \quad (\text{for } a<x<b)$$
exists, then it may be differentiated with respect to x to obtain the Hadamard finite part integral as follows:
$$\frac{d}{dx} \left(\mathcal{C}\int_{a}^{b} \frac{f(t)}{t-x} \,dt\right)=\mathcal{H}\int_a^b \frac{f(t)}{(t-x)^2}\, dt \quad (\text{for } a<x<b).$$

Note that the symbols $\mathcal{C}$ and $\mathcal{H}$ are used here to denote Cauchy principal value and Hadamard finite-part integrals respectively.

The Hadamard finite part integral above (for a < x < b) may also be given by the following equivalent definitions:
$$\mathcal{H}\int_a^b \frac{f(t)}{(t-x)^2}\, dt = \lim_{\varepsilon \to 0^+} \left\{ \int_a^{x-\varepsilon} \frac{f(t)}{(t-x)^2} \, dt + \int_{x+\varepsilon}^b\frac{f(t)}{(t-x)^2}\,dt -\frac{f(x+\varepsilon)+f(x-\varepsilon)}{\varepsilon}\right\},$$
$$\mathcal{H}\int_a^b \frac{f(t)}{(t-x)^2}\, dt = \lim_{\varepsilon \to 0^+} \left\{ \int_a^b \frac{(t-x)^{2}f(t)}
{((t-x)^2+\varepsilon^2)^2}\,dt -\frac{\pi f(x)}{2\varepsilon}- \frac{f(x)}{2} \left(\frac{1}{b-x}-\frac{1}{a-x}\right)\right\}.$$

The definitions above may be derived by assuming that the function f (t) is differentiable infinitely many times at t = x for a < x < b, that is, by assuming that f (t) can be represented by its Taylor series about t = x. For details, see Ang (2013). (Note that the term − (f (x))/2(1/(b − x) − 1/(a − x)) in the second equivalent definition above is missing in Ang (2013) but this is corrected in the errata sheet of the book.)

Integral equations containing Hadamard finite part integrals (with f (t) unknown) are termed hypersingular integral equations. Hypersingular integral equations arise in the formulation of many problems in mechanics, such as in fracture analysis.

== Example ==
Consider the divergent integral
$$\int_{-1}^1 \frac{1}{t^2} \, dt = \left( \lim_{a \to 0^-} \int_{-1}^{a} \frac{1}{t^2} \, dt \right) + \left( \lim_{b \to 0^+} \int_{b}^{1} \frac{1}{t^2} \, dt \right) = \lim_{a\to 0^-} \left( -\frac{1}{a} - 1 \right) + \lim_{b\to 0^+} \left(-1 + \frac{1}{b}\right)= +\infty$$
Its Cauchy principal value also diverges since
$$\mathcal{C} \int_{-1}^1 \frac{1}{t^2} \, dt = \lim_{\varepsilon \to 0^+} \left( \int_{-1}^{-\varepsilon} \frac{1}{t^2} \, dt + \int_{\varepsilon}^1 \frac{1}{t^2} \, dt \right) = \lim_{\varepsilon \to 0^+} \left( \frac{1}{\varepsilon} - 1 - 1 + \frac{1}{\varepsilon} \right) = +\infty$$
To assign a finite value to this divergent integral, we may consider
$$\mathcal{H}\int_{-1}^1 \frac{1}{t^2} \, dt = \mathcal{H} \int_{-1}^1 \frac{1}{(t-x)^2} \, dt \Bigg|_{x=0} = \frac{d}{dx}\left( \mathcal{C} \int_{-1}^1 \frac{1}{t-x} \, dt \right) \Bigg|_{x=0}$$
The inner Cauchy principal value is given by
$$\mathcal{C} \int_{-1}^1 \frac{1}{t-x} \, dt = \lim_{\varepsilon \to 0^+} \left( \int_{-1}^{-\varepsilon} \frac{1}{t-x} \, dt + \int_{\varepsilon}^1 \frac{1}{t-x} \, dt \right) = \lim_{\varepsilon \to 0^+} \left( \ln\left| \frac{\varepsilon +x}{1+x} \right| + \ln \left| \frac{1-x}{\varepsilon - x} \right| \right) = \ln\left| \frac{1-x}{1+x} \right|$$
Therefore,
$$\mathcal{H}\int_{-1}^1 \frac{1}{t^2} \, dt = \frac{d}{dx}\left( \ln\left| \frac{1-x}{1+x} \right| \right) \Bigg|_{x=0} = \frac{2}{x^2-1}\Bigg|_{x=0} = -2$$
Note that this value does not represent the area under the curve y(t) = 1/t^{2}, which is clearly always positive. However, it can be seen where this comes from. Recall the Cauchy principal value of this integral, when evaluated at the endpoints, took the form $\lim_{\varepsilon \to 0^+} \left( \frac{1}{\varepsilon} - 1 - 1 + \frac{1}{\varepsilon} \right) = +\infty$

If one removes the infinite components, the pair of $\frac{1}{\varepsilon}$ terms, that which remains, the finite part, is $\lim_{\varepsilon \to 0^+} \left( - 1 - 1 \right) = -2$

which equals the value derived above.
