= Erwin Kreyszig =

German mathematician (1922–2008)

Erwin O. Kreyszig
- Born: 6 January 1922; Pirna, Saxony, Germany
- Died: 12 December 2008 (aged 86)
- Education: University of Darmstadt; University of Tübingen; University of Münster
- Known for: Work in differential equations, PDEs, and engineering mathematics
- Scientific career
- Fields: Applied mathematics
- Workplaces: Carleton University; University of Windsor; Stanford University; University of Ottawa; Ohio State University; Technical University of Graz; University of Düsseldorf; University of Karlsruhe

Erwin Otto Kreyszig (6 January 1922 in Pirna, Germany – 12 December 2008) was a German Canadian applied mathematician and the Professor of Mathematics at Carleton University in Ottawa, Ontario, Canada. He was a pioneer in the field of applied mathematics: non-wave replicating linear systems. He was also a distinguished author, having written the textbook Advanced Engineering Mathematics, the leading textbook for civil, mechanical, electrical, and chemical engineering undergraduate engineering mathematics.

Kreyszig received his PhD degree in 1949 at the University of Darmstadt under the supervision of Alwin Walther. He then continued his research activities at the universities of Tübingen and Münster. Prior to joining Carleton University in 1984, he held positions at Stanford University (1954/1955), the University of Ottawa (1955/1956), Ohio State University (1956–1960, professor 1957) and he completed his habilitation at the University of Mainz. In 1960 he became professor at the Technical University of Graz and organized the Graz 1964 Mathematical Congress. He worked at the University of Düsseldorf (1967–1971) and at the University of Karlsruhe (1971–1973). From 1973 through 1984 he worked at the University of Windsor and since 1984 he had been at Carleton University. He was awarded the title of Distinguished Research Professor in 1991 in recognition of a research career during which he published 176 papers in refereed journals, and 37 in refereed conference proceedings.

Kreyszig was also an administrator, developing a Computer Centre at the University of Graz, and at the Mathematics Institute at the University of Düsseldorf. In 1964, he took a leave of absence from Graz to initiate a doctoral program in mathematics at Texas A&M University.

Kreyszig authored 14 books, including Advanced Engineering Mathematics, which was published in its 10th edition in 2011. He supervised 104 master's and 22 doctoral students as well as 12 postdoctoral researchers. Together with his son he founded the Erwin and Herbert Kreyszig Scholarship which has funded graduate students since 2001.

== Books ==
- Statistische Methoden und ihre Anwendungen, Vandenhoeck & Ruprecht, Göttingen, 1965.
- Introduction to Differential Geometry and Riemannian Geometry (English Translation), University of Toronto Press, 1968.
- (with Kracht, Manfred): Methods of Complex Analysis in Partial Differential Equations with Applications, Wiley, 1988, ISBN 978-0-471-83091-7.
- Introductory Functional Analysis with Applications, Wiley, 1989, ISBN 978-0-471-50459-7.
- Differentialgeometrie. Leipzig 1957; engl. Differential Geometry, Dover, 1991, ISBN 978-0-486-66721-8.
- Advanced Engineering Mathematics, Wiley, (First edition 1962; ninth edition 2006, ISBN 978-0-471-48885-9; tenth edition (posthumous) 2011, ISBN 978-0-470-45836-5).

== Literature ==
- Kracht, Manfred W. (1992). "In honor of professor Erwin Kreyszig on the occasion of his seventieth birthday". Complex Variables, Theory and Application. 18 (1–2): 1–2. doi:10.1080/17476939208814521. ISSN 0278-1077.
- Obituary by Martin Muldoon
