= Singularity (mathematics) =

Point where a mathematical object behaves irregularly

In mathematics, a singularity is a point at which a given mathematical object is not defined, or a point where the mathematical object ceases to be well-behaved in some particular way, such as by lacking differentiability or analyticity.

For example, the reciprocal function $f(x) = 1/x$ has a singularity at $x = 0$, where the value of the function is not defined, as involving a division by zero. The absolute value function $g(x) = |x|$ also has a singularity at $x = 0$, since it is not differentiable there.

The algebraic curve defined by $\left\{ (x,y):y^3-x^2 = 0 \right\}$ in the $(x, y)$ coordinate system has a singularity (called a cusp) at $(0, 0)$. For singularities in algebraic geometry, see singular point of an algebraic variety. For singularities in differential geometry, see singularity theory.

== Real analysis ==
In real analysis, singularities are either discontinuities, or discontinuities of the derivative (sometimes also discontinuities of higher order derivatives). There are four kinds of discontinuities: type I, which has two subtypes, and type II, which can also be divided into two subtypes (though usually is not).

To describe the way these two types of limits are being used, suppose that $f(x)$ is a function of a real argument $x$, and for any value of its argument, say $c$, then the left-handed limit, $f(c^-)$, and the right-handed limit, $f(c^+)$, are defined by:

$f(c^-) = \lim_{x \to c}f(x)$, constrained by $x < c$ and

$f(c^+) = \lim_{x \to c}f(x)$, constrained by $x > c$.

The value $f(c^-)$ is the value that the function $f(x)$ tends towards as the value $x$ approaches $c$ from below, and the value $f(c^+)$ is the value that the function $f(x)$ tends towards as the value $x$ approaches $c$ from above, regardless of the actual value the function has at the point where $x = c$ .

There are some functions for which these limits do not exist at all. For example, the function

$$g(x) = \sin\left(\frac{1}{x}\right)$$

does not tend towards anything as $x$ approaches $c = 0$. The limits in this case are not infinite, but rather undefined: there is no value that $g(x)$ settles in on. Borrowing from complex analysis, this is sometimes called an essential singularity.

The possible cases at a given value $c$ for the argument are as follows.

- A point of continuity is a value of $c$ for which $f(c^-) = f(c) = f(c^+)$, as one expects for a smooth function. All the values must be finite. If $c$ is not a point of continuity, then a discontinuity occurs at $c$.
- A type I discontinuity occurs when both $f(c^-)$ and $f(c^+)$ exist and are finite, but at least one of the following three conditions also applies:
  - $f(c^-) \neq f(c^+)$;
  - $f(x)$ is not defined for the case of $x = c$; or
  - $f(c)$ has a defined value, which, however, does not match the value of the two limits.
  Type I discontinuities can be further distinguished as being one of the following subtypes:
  - A jump discontinuity occurs when $f(c^-) \neq f(c^+)$, regardless of whether $f(c)$ is defined, and regardless of its value if it is defined.
  - A removable discontinuity occurs when $f(c^-) = f(c^+)$, also regardless of whether $f(c)$ is defined, and regardless of its value if it is defined (but which does not match that of the two limits).
- A type II discontinuity occurs when either $f(c^-)$ or $f(c^+)$ does not exist (possibly both). This has two subtypes, which are usually not considered separately:
  - An infinite discontinuity is the special case when either the left hand or right hand limit does not exist, specifically because it is infinite, and the other limit is either also infinite, or is some well defined finite number. In other words, the function has an infinite discontinuity when its graph has a vertical asymptote.
  - An essential singularity is a term borrowed from complex analysis (see below). This is the case when either one or the other limits $f(c^-)$ or $f(c^+)$ does not exist, but not because it is an infinite discontinuity. Essential singularities approach no limit, not even if valid answers are extended to include $\pm\infty$.

In real analysis, a singularity or discontinuity is a property of a function alone. Any singularities that may exist in the derivative of a function are considered as belonging to the derivative, not to the original function.

=== Coordinate singularities ===
A coordinate singularity occurs when an apparent singularity or discontinuity occurs in one coordinate frame, which can be removed by choosing a different frame. An example of this is the apparent singularity at the 90 degree latitude in spherical coordinates. An object moving due north (for example, along the line 0 degrees longitude) on the surface of a sphere will suddenly experience an instantaneous change in longitude at the pole (in the case of the example, jumping from longitude 0 to longitude 180 degrees). This discontinuity, however, is only apparent; it is an artifact of the coordinate system chosen, which is singular at the poles. A different coordinate system would eliminate the apparent discontinuity (e.g., by replacing the latitude/longitude representation with an n-vector representation).

== Complex analysis ==
In complex analysis, there are several classes of singularities. These include the isolated singularities, the nonisolated singularities, and the branch points.

=== Isolated singularities ===
Suppose that $f$ is a function that is complex differentiable in the complement of a point $a$ in an open subset $U$ of the complex numbers $\mathbb{C}.$ Then:

- The point $a$ is a removable singularity of $f$ if there exists a holomorphic function $g$ defined on all of $U$ such that $f(z) = g(z)$ for all $z$ in $U \smallsetminus \{ a \}.$ The function $g$ is a continuous replacement for the function $f.$
- The point $a$ is a pole or non-essential singularity of $f$ if there exists a holomorphic function $g$ defined on $U$ with $g(a)$ nonzero, and a natural number $n$ such that $f(z) = \frac{ g(z) }{(z-a)^n}$ for all $z$ in $U \smallsetminus \{ a \}.$ The least such number $n$ is called the order of the pole. The derivative at a non-essential singularity itself has a non-essential singularity, with $n$ increased by 1 (except if $n$ is 0 so that the singularity is removable).
- The point $a$ is an essential singularity of $f$ if it is neither a removable singularity nor a pole. The point $a$ is an essential singularity if and only if the Laurent series has infinitely many powers of negative degree.

=== Nonisolated singularities ===
Other than isolated singularities, complex functions of one variable may exhibit other singular behaviour. These are termed nonisolated singularities, of which there are two types:

- Cluster points: limit points of isolated singularities. If they are all poles, despite admitting Laurent series expansions on each of them, then no such expansion is possible at its limit.
  For a simple example, consider the function $f\left(z\right)=1/\sin\left(\frac{\pi}{z}\right)$: this function exhibits an infinite number of simple poles at $z=1,\frac{1}{2},\frac{1}{3},\frac{1}{4},\ldots$ that get ever closer to $z=0$, resulting in $f$ having a cluster point singularity at $z=0$.
- Natural boundaries: any non-isolated set (e.g. a curve) on which functions cannot be analytically continued around (or outside them if they are closed curves in the Riemann sphere).
  Examples of functions that exhibit such a set include the lacunary series and the prime zeta function.

=== Branch points ===
Branch points are generally the result of a multi-valued function, such as $\sqrt{z}$ or $\log(z),$ which are defined within a certain limited domain so that the function can be made single-valued within the domain. The cut is a line or curve excluded from the domain to introduce a technical separation between discontinuous values of the function. When the cut is genuinely required, the function will have distinctly different values on each side of the branch cut. The shape of the branch cut is a matter of choice, even though it must connect two different branch points (such as $z = 0$ and $z = \infty$ for $\log(z)$) which are fixed in place.

== Finite-time singularity ==
The reciprocal function, exhibiting hyperbolic growth.

A finite-time singularity occurs when one input variable is time, and an output variable increases towards infinity at a finite time. These are important in kinematics and Partial Differential Equations – infinites do not occur physically, but the behavior near the singularity is often of interest. Mathematically, the simplest finite-time singularities are power laws for various exponents of the form $x^{-\alpha},$ of which the simplest is hyperbolic growth, where the exponent is (negative) 1: $x^{-1}.$ More precisely, in order to get a singularity at positive time as time advances (so the output grows to infinity), one instead uses $(t_0-t)^{-\alpha}$ (using t for time, reversing direction to $-t$ so that time increases to infinity, and shifting the singularity forward from 0 to a fixed time $t_0$).

An example would be the bouncing motion of an inelastic ball on a plane. If idealized motion is considered, in which the same fraction of kinetic energy is lost on each bounce, the frequency of bounces becomes infinite, as the ball comes to rest in a finite time. Other examples of finite-time singularities include the various forms of the Painlevé paradox (for example, the tendency of a chalk to skip when dragged across a blackboard), and how the precession rate of a coin spun on a flat surface accelerates towards infinite—before abruptly stopping (as studied using the Euler's Disk toy).

Hypothetical examples include Heinz von Foerster's facetious "Doomsday's equation" (simplistic models yield infinite human population in finite time).

== Algebraic geometry and commutative algebra ==
In algebraic geometry, a singularity of an algebraic variety is a point of the variety where the tangent space may not be regularly defined. The simplest example of singularities are curves that cross themselves. But there are other types of singularities, like cusps. For example, the equation y^{2} − x^{3} = 0 defines a curve that has a cusp at the origin x = y = 0. One could define the x-axis as a tangent at this point, but this definition can not be the same as the definition at other points. In fact, in this case, the x-axis is a "double tangent."

For affine and projective varieties, the singularities are the points where the Jacobian matrix has a rank which is lower than at other points of the variety.

An equivalent definition in terms of commutative algebra may be given, which extends to abstract varieties and schemes: A point is singular if the local ring at this point is not a regular local ring.

== See also ==
- Catastrophe theory
- Defined and undefined
- Degeneracy (mathematics)
- Hyperbolic growth
- Movable singularity
- Pathological (mathematics)
- Regular singularity
- Singular solution
