= Removable singularity =

Undefined point on a holomorphic function which can be made regular

A graph of a parabola with a removable singularity at x = 2

In complex analysis, a removable singularity of a holomorphic function is a point at which the function is undefined, but it is possible to redefine the function at that point in such a way that the resulting function is regular in a neighbourhood of that point.

For instance, the (unnormalized) sinc function, as defined by

$$\text{sinc}(z) = \frac{\sin z}{z}$$

has a singularity at $z = 0$. This singularity can be removed by defining $\text{sinc}(0) := 1$, which is the limit of sinc as $z$ tends to $0$. The resulting function is holomorphic. In this case the problem was caused by sinc being given an indeterminate form. Taking a power series expansion for $\textstyle \frac{\sin(z)}{z}$ around the singular point shows that

$$\text{sinc}(z) = \frac{1}{z}\left(\sum_{k=0}^{\infty} \frac{(-1)^kz^{2k+1}}{(2k+1)!} \right) = \sum_{k=0}^{\infty} \frac{(-1)^kz^{2k}}{(2k+1)!} = 1 - \frac{z^2}{3!} + \frac{z^4}{5!} - \frac{z^6}{7!} + \cdots.$$

Formally, if $U \subset \mathbb C$ is an open subset of the complex plane $\mathbb C$, $a \in U$ a point of $U$, and $f: U\smallsetminus \{a\} \rightarrow \mathbb C$ is a holomorphic function, then $a$ is called a removable singularity for $f$ if there exists a holomorphic function $g: U \rightarrow \mathbb C$ which coincides with $f$ on $U\smallsetminus \{a\}$. We say $f$ is holomorphically extendable over $U$ if such a $g$ exists.

== Riemann's theorem ==
Riemann's theorem on removable singularities is as follows:

Theorem— Let $D \subset \mathbb C$ be an open subset of the complex plane, $a \in D$ a point of $D$ and $f$ a holomorphic function defined on the set $D \smallsetminus \{a\}$. The following are equivalent:

1. $f$ is holomorphically extendable over $a$.
2. $f$ is continuously extendable over $a$.
3. There exists a neighborhood of $a$ on which $f$ is bounded.
4. $\lim_{z\to a}(z - a) f(z) = 0$.

The implications 1 ⇒ 2 ⇒ 3 ⇒ 4 are trivial. To prove 4 ⇒ 1, we first recall that the holomorphy of a function at $a$ is equivalent to it being analytic at $a$ (proof), i.e. having a power series representation. Define

$$h(z) = \begin{cases}
(z - a)^2 f(z) &  z \ne a ,\\
0              &  z = a .
\end{cases}$$

Clearly, $h$ is holomorphic on $D \smallsetminus \{a\}$, and there exists

$$h'(a)=\lim_{z\to a}\frac{(z - a)^2f(z)-0}{z-a}=\lim_{z\to a}(z - a) f(z)=0$$

by 4, hence $h$ is holomorphic on $D$ and has a Taylor series about $a$:

$$h(z) = c_0 + c_1(z-a) + c_2 (z - a)^2 + c_3 (z - a)^3 + \ldots \, .$$

We have $c_0 = h(a) = 0$ and $c_1 = h'(a) = 0$; therefore

$$h(z) = c_2 (z - a)^2 + c_3 (z - a)^3 + \ldots \, .$$

Hence, where $z \ne a$, we have:

$$f(z) = \frac{h(z)}{(z - a)^2} = c_2 + c_3 (z - a) + \ldots \, .$$

However,

$$g(z) = c_2 + c_3 (z - a) + \cdots \, .$$

is holomorphic on $D$, thus an extension of $f$.

== Other kinds of singularities ==
Unlike functions of a real variable, holomorphic functions are sufficiently rigid that their isolated singularities can be completely classified. A holomorphic function's singularity is either not really a singularity at all, i.e. a removable singularity, or one of the following two types:

1. In light of Riemann's theorem, given a non-removable singularity, one might ask whether there exists a natural number $m$ such that $\lim_{z \rightarrow a}(z-a)^{m+1}f(z)=0$. If so, $a$ is called a pole of $f$ and the smallest such $m$ is the order of $a$. So removable singularities are precisely the poles of order $0$. A meromorphic function blows up uniformly near its other poles.
2. If an isolated singularity $a$ of $f$ is neither removable nor a pole, it is called an essential singularity. The Great Picard Theorem shows that such an $f$ maps every punctured open neighborhood $U \smallsetminus \{a\}$ to the entire complex plane, with the possible exception of at most one point.

== See also ==
- Analytic capacity
- Removable discontinuity
