= Meromorphic function =

Class of mathematical function

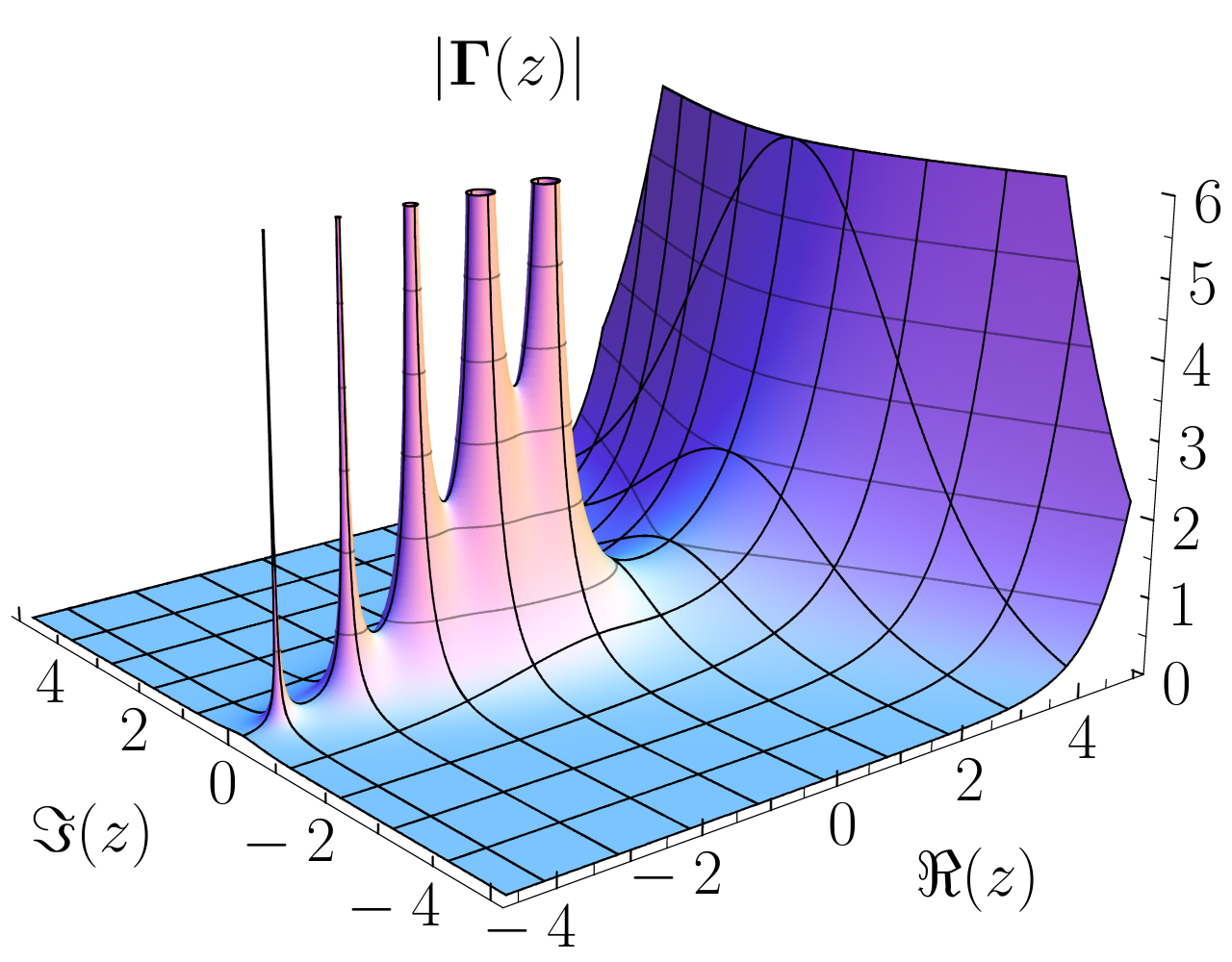
The gamma function is meromorphic in the whole complex plane with poles at the nonpositive integers.

In complex analysis, a meromorphic function on an open subset $D$ of the complex plane is a function that is holomorphic on all of $D$ except for a set of isolated points, which are poles of the function.

Every meromorphic function on $D$ can be expressed as the ratio between two holomorphic functions (with the denominator not constant 0) defined on $D$, where the poles are the zeros of the denominator.

== Heuristic description ==
Intuitively, a meromorphic function is a ratio of two well-behaved (holomorphic) functions. Such a function will still be well-behaved, except possibly at the points where the denominator of the fraction is zero. If the denominator has a zero at $z$ and the numerator does not, then the value of the function will approach infinity; if both parts have a zero at $z$, then one must compare the multiplicity of these zeros.

From an algebraic point of view, if the function's domain is connected, then the set of meromorphic functions is the field of fractions of the integral domain of the set of holomorphic functions. This is analogous to the relationship between the rational numbers and the integers.

== Terminology ==
The terms holomorphic and meromorphic were introduced in 1875 by Charles Briot and Jean-Claude Bouquet, two of Augustin-Louis Cauchy's students. Holomorphic derives from the Greek ὅλος (hólos) meaning "whole", and μορφή (morphḗ) meaning "form" or "appearance" or "type", while meromorphic derives from μέρος (méros) meaning "part". A holomorphic function resembles an entire function ("whole") in a domain of the complex plane while a meromorphic function, resembles a rational fraction ("part") of entire functions in a domain of the complex plane.

In the 1930s, in group theory, the term meromorphic function (or meromorph) was used in a different sense: it meant a function from a group into itself that preserved the group operation. This language is obsolete, and the term endomorphism is now used for such a function.

== Properties ==
Since poles are isolated, there are at most countably many for a meromorphic function. The set of poles can be infinite, as exemplified by the function
$$f(z) = \csc z = \frac{1}{\sin z}.$$

By using analytic continuation to eliminate removable singularities, meromorphic functions can be added, subtracted, multiplied, and the quotient $f/g$ can be formed unless $g(z) = 0$ on a connected component of D. Thus, if D is connected, the meromorphic functions form a field, in fact a field extension of the complex numbers.

=== Higher dimensions ===
In several complex variables, a meromorphic function is defined to be locally a quotient of two holomorphic functions. For example, $f(z_1, z_2) = z_1 / z_2$ is a meromorphic function on the two-dimensional complex affine space. Here it is no longer true that every meromorphic function can be regarded as a holomorphic function with values in the Riemann sphere: There is a set of "indeterminacy" of codimension two (in the given example this set consists of the origin $(0, 0)$).

Unlike in dimension one, in higher dimensions there do exist compact complex manifolds on which there are no non-constant meromorphic functions, for example, most complex tori.

== Examples ==
- All rational functions, for example
  $$f(z) = \frac{z^3 - 2z + 10}{z^5 + 3z - 1},$$
  are meromorphic on the whole complex plane. Furthermore, they are the only meromorphic functions on the extended complex plane.
- The functions
  $$f(z) = \frac{e^z}{z} \quad\text{and}\quad f(z) = \frac{\sin{z}}{(z-1)^2}$$
  as well as the gamma function and the Riemann zeta function are meromorphic on the whole complex plane.
- The function
  $$f(z) = e^\frac{1}{z}$$
  is defined in the whole complex plane except for the origin, 0. However, 0 is not a pole of this function, rather an essential singularity. Thus, this function is not meromorphic in the whole complex plane. However, it is meromorphic (even holomorphic) on $\mathbb{C} \setminus \{0\}$.
- The complex logarithm function
  $$f(z) = \ln(z)$$
  is not meromorphic on the whole complex plane, as it cannot be defined on the whole complex plane while only excluding a set of isolated points.
- The function
  $$f(z) = \csc\frac{1}{z} = \frac1{\sin\left(\frac{1}{z}\right)}$$
  is not meromorphic in the whole plane, since the point $z = 0$ is an accumulation point of poles and is thus not an isolated singularity.
- The function
  $$f(z) = \sin \frac 1 z$$
  is not meromorphic either, as it has an essential singularity at 0.

== On Riemann surfaces ==
On a Riemann surface, every point admits an open neighborhood which is biholomorphic to an open subset of the complex plane. Thereby the notion of a meromorphic function can be defined for every Riemann surface.

When D is the entire Riemann sphere, the field of meromorphic functions is simply the field of rational functions in one variable over the complex field, since one can prove that any meromorphic function on the sphere is rational. (This is a special case of the so-called GAGA principle.)

For every Riemann surface, a meromorphic function is the same as a holomorphic function that maps to the Riemann sphere and which is not the constant function equal to ∞. The poles correspond to those complex numbers which are mapped to ∞.

On a non-compact Riemann surface, every meromorphic function can be realized as a quotient of two (globally defined) holomorphic functions. In contrast, on a compact Riemann surface, every holomorphic function is constant, while there always exist non-constant meromorphic functions.

== See also ==
- Mittag-Leffler's theorem
- Nevanlinna theory
- Weierstrass factorization theorem
- Cousin problems
