= List of things named after Augustin-Louis Cauchy =

Things named after the 19th-century French mathematician Augustin-Louis Cauchy include:

== Mathematics ==
- Bolzano–Cauchy theorem
- Cauchy boundary condition
- Cauchy completion
- Cauchy-continuous function
- Cauchy–Davenport theorem
- Cauchy distribution
  - Log-Cauchy distribution
  - Wrapped Cauchy distribution
- Cauchy–Euler equation
- Cauchy's functional equation
- Cauchy filter
- Cauchy formula for repeated integration
- Cauchy–Frobenius lemma
- Cauchy identity
- Cauchy index
- Cauchy interlacing theorem
- Cauchy–Kovalevskaya theorem or (Cauchy–Kowalevski theorem)
- Cauchy–Lipschitz theorem
- Cauchy matrix (and Cauchy determinant)
- Cauchy net
- Cauchy–Peano theorem
- Cauchy point
- Cauchy principal value
- Cauchy problem
  - Abstract Cauchy problem
- Cauchy process
- Cauchy–Rassias stability
- Cauchy–Schlömilch transformation
- Cauchy–Schwarz inequality
- Cauchy space
- Cauchy's mean value theorem
- Cauchy's theorem (geometry)
- Cauchy's theorem (group theory)
- Cauchy's two-line notation

=== Series and sequences ===
- Binet–Cauchy identity (or Cauchy–Binet equation)
- Cauchy bounds
- Cauchy completeness
- Cauchy condensation test
- Cauchy's convergence test
- Cauchy–Hadamard theorem
- Cauchy product
- Cauchy's radical test
- Cauchy ratio test
- Cauchy sequence
  - Uniformly Cauchy sequence
- Maclaurin–Cauchy test

=== Complex analysis ===
- Cauchy's argument principle
- Cauchy inequality
- Cauchy's integral formula
- Cauchy's integral theorem
- Cauchy–Riemann equations
- Cauchy–Riemann manifold
- Cauchy's residue theorem

== Physics ==
- Cauchy–Born rule
- Cauchy elastic material
- Cauchy's equation or (Cauchy transmission equation)
- Cauchy–Green deformation tensor
- Cauchy horizon
- Cauchy momentum equation
- Cauchy number
- Cauchy surface
- Cauchy stress tensor
- Euler–Cauchy stress principle

== Other ==
- Cauchy (crater)
