= Cauchy's test =

Cauchy's test may refer to:

- Cauchy's root test
- Cauchy's condensation test
- the integral test for convergence, sometimes known as the Maclaurin–Cauchy test

These topics are named after Augustin-Louis Cauchy, a French mathematician.
