= Comparison test =

Comparison test can mean:

- Limit comparison test, a method of testing for the convergence of an infinite series.
- Direct comparison test, a way of deducing the convergence or divergence of an infinite series or an improper integral.
