= Master theorem =

In mathematics, a theorem that covers a variety of cases is sometimes called a master theorem.

Some theorems called master theorems in their fields include:

- Master theorem (analysis of algorithms), analyzing the asymptotic behavior of divide-and-conquer algorithms
- Ramanujan's master theorem, providing an analytic expression for the Mellin transform of an analytic function
- MacMahon master theorem (MMT), in enumerative combinatorics and linear algebra
- Glasser's master theorem in integral calculus
