= Bertrand series =

In mathematics, a Bertrand series is a series of real numbers of the form

$$\sum_n  \frac{1}{n^\alpha (\ln n)^\beta}$$

where $\alpha$ and $\beta$ are two real numbers. They are named after Joseph Bertrand.

For $\beta=0$, this series reduces to the series $\textstyle \sum_n \frac{1}{n^\alpha}$ defining the Riemann zeta function.

One can show a necessary and sufficient condition of convergence for such series: it converges if and only if $\alpha>1$ or ($\alpha=1$ and $\beta>1$). It can be proved by using the integral test for convergence or the Cauchy condensation test.

One has the following approximate values:

- $\sum_{n\geq 2}\frac1{n(\ln n)^2}\approx 2.10974$ (sequence A115563 in the OEIS);
- $\sum_{n\geq 2}\frac1{n(\ln n)^3}\approx 2.06589$ (sequence A145419 in the OEIS);
- $\sum_{n\geq 2}\frac1{n^2\ln n}\approx 0.60552$ (sequence A168218 in the OEIS).
