= Jordan's lemma =

Theorem in complex analysis

In complex analysis, Jordan's lemma is a result frequently used in conjunction with the residue theorem to evaluate contour integrals and improper integrals. The lemma is named after the French mathematician Camille Jordan.

== Statement ==
Consider a complex-valued, continuous function f, defined on a semicircular contour

$$C_R = \{R e^{i \theta} \mid \theta \in [0, \pi]\}$$

of positive radius R lying in the upper half-plane, centered at the origin. If the function f is of the form

$$f(z) = e^{i a z} g(z) , \quad z \in C ,$$

with a positive parameter a, then Jordan's lemma states the following upper bound for the contour integral:

$$\left| \int_{C_R} f(z) \, dz \right| \le \frac{\pi}{a} M_R \quad \text{where} \quad M_R := \max_{\theta \in [0,\pi]} \left| g \left(R e^{i \theta}\right) \right| .$$

with equality when g vanishes everywhere, in which case both sides are identically zero. An analogous statement for a semicircular contour in the lower half-plane holds when a < 0.

=== Remarks ===
- If f is continuous on the semicircular contour C_{R} for all large R and

$\lim_{R \to \infty} M_R = 0$	*

then by Jordan's lemma $\lim_{R \to \infty} \int_{C_R} f(z)\, dz = 0.$

- For the case a = 0, see the estimation lemma.
- Compared to the estimation lemma, the upper bound in Jordan's lemma does not explicitly depend on the length of the contour C_{R}.

== Application of Jordan's lemma ==
The path C is the concatenation of the paths C_{1} and C_{2}.

Jordan's lemma yields a simple way to calculate the integral along the real axis of functions f(z) = e^{i a z} g(z) holomorphic on the upper half-plane and continuous on the closed upper half-plane, except possibly at a finite number of non-real points z_{1}, z_{2}, …, z_{n}. Consider the closed contour C, which is the concatenation of the paths C_{1} and C_{2} shown in the picture. By definition,

$$\oint_C f(z) \, dz = \int_{C_1}f(z)\,dz + \int_{C_2} f(z)\,dz\,.$$

Since on C_{2} the variable z is real, the second integral is real:

$$\int_{C_2} f(z) \, dz = \int_{-R}^{R} f(x)\,dx\,.$$

The left-hand side may be computed using the residue theorem to get, for all R larger than the maximum of |z_{1}|, |z_{2}|, …, |z_{n}|,

$$\oint_{C} f(z)\, dz = 2\pi i \sum_{k=1}^n \operatorname{Res}(f, z_k)\,,$$

where Res(f, z_{k}) denotes the residue of f at the singularity z_{k}. Hence, if f satisfies condition (*), then taking the limit as R tends to infinity, the contour integral over C_{1} vanishes by Jordan's lemma and we get the value of the improper integral

$$\int_{-\infty}^{\infty} f(x)\,dx = 2\pi i \sum_{k=1}^n \operatorname{Res}(f, z_k)\,.$$

== Example ==
The function

$$f(z)=\frac{e^{iz}}{1+z^2},\qquad z\in{\mathbb C}\setminus\{i,-i\},$$

satisfies the condition of Jordan's lemma with a = 1 for all R > 0 with R ≠ 1. Note that, for R > 1,

$$M_R=\max_{\theta\in[0,\pi]}\frac1{|1+R^2e^{2i\theta}|}=\frac1{R^2-1}\,,$$

hence (*) holds. Since the only singularity of f in the upper half plane is at z = i, the above application yields

$$\int_{-\infty}^\infty \frac{e^{ix}}{1+x^2}\,dx=2\pi i\,\operatorname{Res}(f,i)\,.$$

Since z = i is a simple pole of f and 1 + z^{2} = (z + i)(z − i), we obtain

$$\operatorname{Res}(f,i)=\lim_{z\to i}(z-i)f(z)
=\lim_{z\to i}\frac{e^{iz}}{z+i}=\frac{e^{-1}}{2i}$$

so that

$$\int_{-\infty}^\infty \frac{\cos x}{1+x^2}\,dx=\operatorname{Re}\int_{-\infty}^\infty \frac{e^{ix}}{1+x^2}\,dx=\frac{\pi}{e}\,.$$

This result exemplifies the way some integrals difficult to compute with classical methods are easily evaluated with the help of complex analysis.

This example shows that Jordan's lemma can be used instead of a much simpler estimation lemma. Indeed, estimation lemma suffices to calculate $\int_{-\infty}^\infty \frac{e^{ix}}{1+x^2}\,dx$, as well as $\int_{-\infty}^\infty \frac{\cos x}{1+x^2}\,dx$, Jordan's lemma here is unnecessary.

== Proof of Jordan's lemma ==
By definition of the complex line integral,

$$\int_{C_R} f(z)\, dz
=\int_0^\pi g(Re^{i\theta})\,e^{iaR(\cos\theta+i \sin\theta)}\,i Re^{i\theta}\,d\theta
=R\int_0^\pi g(Re^{i\theta})\,e^{aR(i\cos\theta-\sin\theta)}\,ie^{i\theta}\,d\theta\,.$$

Now the inequality

$$\biggl|\int_a^b f(x)\,dx\biggr|\le\int_a^b \left|f(x)\right|\,dx$$

yields

$$I_R:=\biggl|\int_{C_R} f(z)\, dz\biggr|
\le R\int_0^\pi\bigl|g(Re^{i\theta})\,e^{aR(i\cos\theta-\sin\theta)}\,ie^{i\theta} \bigr|\,d\theta
=R\int_0^\pi \bigl|g(Re^{i\theta})\bigr|\,e^{-aR\sin\theta}\,d\theta\,.$$

Using M_{R} as defined in (*) and the symmetry sin θ = sin(π − θ), we obtain

$$I_R \le RM_R\int_0^\pi e^{-aR\sin\theta}\,d\theta = 2RM_R\int_0^{\pi/2} e^{-aR\sin\theta}\,d\theta\,.$$

Since the graph of sin θ is concave on the interval θ ∈ [0, π / 2], the graph of sin θ lies above the straight line connecting its endpoints, hence

$$\sin\theta\ge \frac{2\theta}{\pi}\quad$$

for all θ ∈ [0, π / 2], which further implies

$$I_R
\le 2RM_R \int_0^{\pi/2} e^{-2aR\theta/\pi}\,d\theta
=\frac{\pi}{a} (1-e^{-a R}) M_R\le\frac\pi{a}M_R\,.$$

== See also ==
- Estimation lemma
