= Louis François Cauchy =

French civil servant (1760–1848)

Louis François Cauchy (27 May 1760 – 28 December 1848) was a senior French government official and the father of the mathematician Augustin-Louis Cauchy.

Born on 27 May 1760 in Rouen into an upper-middle-class family, Cauchy successfully studied at the Collège de Lisieux in Paris. In 1771 he received the top prize in the concours général.

He became a lawyer at the Parlement of Normandy, and in 1783 he joined the office of the Intendant Général of Rouen, Louis Thiroux de Crosne. When de Crosne took charge of the Paris police, Cauchy followed him as his senior aide. In October 1787 he married Marie-Madeleine Desestre, who came from a family of Parisian officers, and the couple had four children, Augustin-Louis Cauchy (1789–1857), Alexandre Laurent Cauchy (1792–1857), Eugène François Cauchy (1802–1877) and a daughter.

On the year of Augustin-Louis Cauchy's birth, Louis François moved his entire family to the small village of Arcueil.

In April 1794, de Crosne was executed by the French revolutionary government. Cauchy then had no official role until the country came under the rule of Napoleon Bonaparte.

In 1800, he was elected Keeper of the Seals (Garde des Sceaux) in the French Senate, and also became secretary and archivist of the Chamber of Peers. He was ennobled by King Charles X in 1825.

He died in Arcueil in 1848.

== Bibliography ==
Bruno Belhoste : Cauchy, un mathématicien légitimiste au XIXème Siècle
