= Residue at infinity =

In complex analysis, a branch of mathematics, the residue at infinity is a residue of a holomorphic function on an annulus having an infinite external radius. The infinity $\infty$ is a point added to the local space $\mathbb C$ in order to render it compact (in this case it is a one-point compactification). This space denoted $\hat{\mathbb C}$ is isomorphic to the Riemann sphere. One can use the residue at infinity to calculate some integrals.

== Definition ==
Given a holomorphic function f on an annulus $A(0, R, \infty)$ (centered at 0, with inner radius $R$ and infinite outer radius), the residue at infinity of the function f can be defined in terms of the usual residue as follows:

$$\operatorname{Res}(f,\infty) = -\operatorname{Res}\left( {1\over z^2}f\left({1\over z}\right), 0  \right).$$

Thus, one can transfer the study of $f(z)$ at infinity to the study of $f(1/z)$ at the origin.

Note that $\forall r > R$, we have

$$\operatorname{Res}(f, \infty) = {-1\over 2\pi i}\int_{C(0, r)} f(z) \, dz.$$

Since, for holomorphic functions the sum of the residues at the isolated singularities plus the residue at infinity is zero, it can be expressed as:

$\operatorname{Res}(f(z), \infty) = -\sum_k \operatorname{Res}\left(f\left(z\right), a_k\right).$

== Motivation ==
One might first guess that the definition of the residue of $f(z)$ at infinity should just be the residue of $f(1/z)$ at $z=0$. However, the reason that we consider instead $-\frac{1}{z^2}f\left(\frac{1}{z}\right)$ is that one does not take residues of functions, but of differential forms, i.e. the residue of $f(z)dz$ at infinity is the residue of $f\left(\frac{1}{z}\right)d\left(\frac{1}{z}\right)=-\frac{1}{z^2}f\left(\frac{1}{z}\right)dz$ at $z=0$.

== See also ==
- Riemann sphere
- Algebraic variety
- Residue theorem
