= Contour integration =

Method of evaluating certain integrals along paths in the complex plane

In complex analysis, contour integration is a method of evaluating certain integrals along paths in the complex plane. Contour integration is used to study complex-valued functions that are holomorphic in a region.

Contour integration is closely related to the calculus of residues, a method of complex analysis. The power of contour integration comes from the fact that the integrals of holomorphic functions are invariant under deforming the contour, provided the deformation does not cross a singularity or branch cut. Thus the value of a contour integral between fixed endpoints is not governed by the precise shape of the contour, but by its winding around the singularities of the integrand.

One use of contour integrals is the evaluation of certain integrals of functions over the real line. Regarding the real line as a contour, and deforming it into the complex plane often leads to simpler integrals than those which can be found by using only real variable methods. In modern language, the integral of a holomorphic or meromorphic function is a pairing between a cohomology class of differential forms and a homology class of cycles in the domain of the function. It also has various applications to physics.

== Curves in the complex plane ==
In complex analysis, a contour is a type of curve in the complex plane. In contour integration, contours provide a precise definition of the curves on which an integral may be suitably defined. A curve in the complex plane is defined as a continuous function from a closed interval of the real line to the complex plane: $z:[a,b]\to\C$.

This definition of a curve coincides with the intuitive notion of a curve, but includes a parametrization by a continuous function from a closed interval. This more precise definition allows us to consider what properties a curve must have for it to be useful for integration. In the following subsections we narrow down the set of curves that we can integrate to include only those that can be built up out of a finite number of continuous curves that can be given a direction. Moreover, we will restrict the "pieces" from crossing over themselves, and we require that each piece have a finite (non-vanishing) continuous derivative. These requirements correspond to requiring that we consider only curves that can be traced, such as by a pen, in a sequence of even, steady strokes, which stop only to start a new piece of the curve, all without picking up the pen.

=== Directed smooth curves ===
Contours are often defined in terms of directed smooth curves. These provide a precise definition of a "piece" of a smooth curve, of which a contour is made.

A smooth curve is a curve $z:[a,b]\to\C$ with a non-vanishing, continuous derivative such that each point is traversed only once (z is one-to-one), with the possible exception of a curve such that the endpoints match ($z(a)=z(b)$). In the case where the endpoints match, the curve is called closed, and the function is required to be one-to-one everywhere else and the derivative must be continuous at the identified point ($z'(a)=z'(b)$). A smooth curve that is not closed is often referred to as a smooth arc.

The parametrization of a curve provides a natural ordering of points on the curve: $z(x)$ comes before $z(y)$ if $x<y$. This leads to the notion of a directed smooth curve. It is most useful to consider curves independent of the specific parametrization. This can be done by considering equivalence classes of smooth curves with the same direction. A directed smooth curve can then be defined as an ordered set of points in the complex plane that is the image of some smooth curve in their natural order (according to the parametrization). Note that not all orderings of the points are the natural ordering of a smooth curve. In fact, a given smooth curve has only two such orderings. Also, a single closed curve can have any point as its endpoint, while a smooth arc has only two choices for its endpoints.

=== Contours ===
Contours are the class of curves on which we define contour integration. A contour is a directed curve which is made up of a finite sequence of directed smooth curves whose endpoints are matched to give a single direction. This requires that the sequence of curves $\gamma_1,\dots,\gamma_n$ be such that the terminal point of $\gamma_i$ coincides with the initial point of $\gamma_{i+1}$ for all $i$ such that $1\leq i<n$ . This includes all directed smooth curves. Also, a single point in the complex plane is considered a contour. The symbol $+$ is often used to denote the piecing of curves together to form a new curve. Thus we could write a contour $\Gamma$ that is made up of $n$ curves as
$$\Gamma = \gamma_1 + \gamma_2 + \cdots + \gamma_n.$$

== Contour integrals ==
The contour integral of a complex function $f:\C\to\C$ is a generalization of the integral for real-valued functions. For continuous functions in the complex plane, the contour integral can be defined in analogy to the line integral by first defining the integral along a directed smooth curve in terms of an integral over a real valued parameter. A more general definition can be given in terms of partitions of the contour in analogy with the partition of an interval and the Riemann integral. In both cases the integral over a contour is defined as the sum of the integrals over the directed smooth curves that make up the contour.

=== For continuous functions ===
To define the contour integral in this way one must first consider the integral, over a real variable, of a complex-valued function. Let $f:\R\to\C$ be a complex-valued function of a real variable, $t$. The real and imaginary parts of $f$ are often denoted as $u(t)$ and $v(t)$, respectively, so that
$$f(t) = u(t) + iv(t).$$
Then the integral of the complex-valued function $f$ over the interval $[a,b]$ is given by
$$\begin{align}
\int_a^b f(t) \, dt &= \int_a^b \big( u(t) + i v(t) \big) \, dt \\
&= \int_a^b u(t) \, dt + i \int_a^b v(t) \, dt.
\end{align}$$

Now, to define the contour integral, let $f:\C\to\C$ be a continuous function on the directed smooth curve $\gamma$. Let $z:[a,b]\to\C$ be any parametrization of $\gamma$ that is consistent with its order (direction). Then the integral along $\gamma$ is denoted
$$\int_\gamma f(z)\, dz\,$$
and is given by
$$\int_\gamma f(z) \, dz := \int_a^b f\big(z(t)\big) z'(t) \, dt.$$

This definition is well defined. That is, the result is independent of the parametrization chosen. In the case where the real integral on the right side does not exist the integral along $\gamma$ is said not to exist.

=== As a generalization of the Riemann integral ===
The generalization of the Riemann integral to functions of a complex variable is done in complete analogy to its definition for functions from the real numbers. The partition of a directed smooth curve $\gamma$ is defined as a finite, ordered set of points on $\gamma$. The integral over the curve is the limit of finite sums of function values, taken at the points on the partition, in the limit that the maximum distance between any two successive points on the partition (in the two-dimensional complex plane), also known as the mesh, goes to zero.

== Direct methods ==
Direct methods involve the calculation of the integral through methods similar to those in calculating line integrals in multivariate calculus. This means that we use the following method:

- parametrizing the contour
  The contour is parametrized by a differentiable complex-valued function of real variables, or the contour is broken up into pieces and parametrized separately.
- substitution of the parametrization into the integrand
  Substituting the parametrization into the integrand transforms the integral into an integral of one real variable.
- direct evaluation
  The integral is evaluated in a method akin to a real-variable integral.

=== Example ===
A fundamental result in complex analysis is that the contour integral of 1/z is 2πi, where the path of the contour is taken to be the unit circle traversed counterclockwise (or any positively oriented Jordan curve about 0). In the case of the unit circle there is a direct method to evaluate the integral
$$\oint_C \frac{1}{z}\,dz.$$

In evaluating this integral, use the unit circle |z| = 1 as a contour, parametrized by z(t) = e^{it}, with t ∈ [0, 2π], then dz/dt = ie^{it} and
$$\oint_C \frac{1}{z}\,dz = \int_0^{2\pi} \frac{1}{e^{it}} ie^{it}\,dt = i\int_0^{2\pi} 1 \, dt = i \, t\Big|_0^{2\pi} = \left(2\pi-0\right)i = 2\pi i ,$$
which is the value of the integral. This result only applies to the case in which z is raised to power of −1. If the power is not equal to −1, then the result will always be zero.

== Applications of integral theorems ==
Applications of integral theorems are also often used to evaluate the contour integral along a contour, which means that the real-valued integral is calculated simultaneously along with calculating the contour integral.

Integral theorems such as the Cauchy integral formula or residue theorem are generally used in the following method:

- a specific contour is chosen:
  The contour is chosen so that the contour follows the part of the complex plane that describes the real-valued integral, and also encloses singularities of the integrand so application of the Cauchy integral formula or residue theorem is possible
- application of Cauchy's integral theorem
  The integral is reduced to only an integration around a small circle about each pole.
- application of the Cauchy integral formula or residue theorem
  Application of these integral formulae gives us a value for the integral around the whole of the contour.
- division of the contour into a contour along the real part and imaginary part
  The whole of the contour can be divided into the contour that follows the part of the complex plane that describes the real-valued integral as chosen before (call it R), and the integral that crosses the complex plane (call it I). The integral over the whole of the contour is the sum of the integral over each of these contours.
- demonstration that the integral that crosses the complex plane plays no part in the sum
  If the integral I can be shown to be zero, or if the real-valued integral that is sought is improper, then if we demonstrate that the integral I as described above tends to 0, the integral along R will tend to the integral around the contour R + I.
- conclusion
  If we can show the above step, then we can directly calculate R, the real-valued integral.

=== Example 1 ===
Consider the integral
$$\int_{-\infty}^\infty \frac{1}{\left(x^2+1\right)^2}\,dx,$$

To evaluate this integral, we look at the complex-valued function
$$f(z)=\frac{1}{\left(z^2+1\right)^2}$$

which has singularities at i and −i. We choose a contour that will enclose the real-valued integral, here a semicircle with boundary diameter on the real line (going from, say, −a to a) will be convenient. Call this contour C.

There are two ways of proceeding, using the Cauchy integral formula or by the method of residues:

==== Using the Cauchy integral formula ====
Note that:
$$\oint_C f(z)\,dz = \int_{-a}^a f(z)\,dz + \int_\text{Arc} f(z)\,dz$$
thus
$$\int_{-a}^a f(z)\,dz = \oint_C f(z)\,dz - \int_\text{Arc} f(z)\,dz$$

Furthermore, observe that
$$f(z)=\frac{1}{\left(z^2+1\right)^2}=\frac{1}{(z+i)^2(z-i)^2}.$$

Since the only singularity in the contour is the one at i, then we can write
$$f(z)=\frac{\frac{1}{(z+i)^2}}{(z-i)^2},$$

which puts the function in the form for direct application of the formula. Then, by using Cauchy's integral formula,
$$\oint_C f(z)\,dz = \oint_C \frac{\frac{1}{(z+i)^2}}{(z-i)^2}\,dz = 2\pi i \, \left.\frac{d}{dz} \frac{1}{(z+i)^2}\right|_{z=i} =2 \pi i \left[\frac{-2}{(z+i)^3}\right]_{z = i} =\frac{\pi}{2}$$

We take the first derivative, in the above steps, because the pole is a second-order pole. That is, (z − i) is taken to the second power, so we employ the first derivative of f(z). If it were (z − i) taken to the third power, we would use the second derivative and divide by 2!, etc. The case of (z − i) to the first power corresponds to a zero order derivative—just f(z) itself.

We need to show that the integral over the arc of the semicircle tends to zero as a → ∞, using the estimation lemma
$$\left|\int_\text{Arc} f(z)\,dz\right| \le ML$$

where M is an upper bound on |f(z)| along the arc and L the length of the arc. Now,
$$\left|\int_\text{Arc} f(z)\,dz\right|\le \frac{a\pi}{\left(a^2-1\right)^2} \to 0 \text{ as } a \to \infty.$$
So
$$\int_{-\infty}^\infty \frac{1}{\left(x^2+1\right)^2}\,dx = \int_{-\infty}^\infty f(z)\,dz = \lim_{a \to +\infty} \int_{-a}^a f(z)\,dz = \frac{\pi}2.\quad\square$$

==== Using the method of residues ====
Consider the Laurent series of f(z) about i, the only singularity we need to consider. We then have
$$f(z) = \frac{-1}{4(z-i)^2} + \frac{-i}{4(z-i)} + \frac{3}{16} + \frac{i}{8}(z-i) + \frac{-5}{64}(z-i)^2 + \cdots$$

(See the sample Laurent calculation from Laurent series for the derivation of this series.)

It is clear by inspection that the residue is −i/4, so, by the residue theorem, we have
$$\oint_C f(z)\,dz = \oint_C \frac{1}{\left(z^2+1\right)^2}\,dz = 2 \pi i \,\operatorname{Res}_{z=i} f(z) = 2 \pi i \left(-\frac{i}{4}\right)=\frac{\pi}2 \quad\square$$

Thus we get the same result as before.

==== Contour note ====
As an aside, a question can arise whether we do not take the semicircle to include the other singularity, enclosing −i. To have the integral along the real axis moving in the correct direction, the contour must travel clockwise, i.e., in a negative direction, reversing the sign of the integral overall.

This does not affect the use of the method of residues by series.

=== Example 2 – Cauchy distribution ===
The integral
$$\int_{-\infty}^\infty \frac{e^{itx}}{x^2+1}\,dx$$

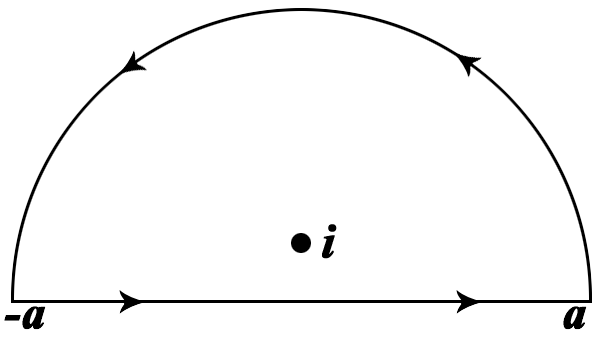
the contour

(which arises in probability theory as a scalar multiple of the characteristic function of the Cauchy distribution) resists the techniques of elementary calculus. We will evaluate it by expressing it as a limit of contour integrals along the contour C that goes along the real line from −a to a and then counterclockwise along a semicircle centered at 0 from a to −a. Take a to be greater than 1, so that the imaginary unit i is enclosed within the curve. The contour integral is
$$\int_C \frac{e^{itz} }{ z^2+1}\,dz.$$

Since e^{itz} is an entire function (having no singularities at any point in the complex plane), this function has singularities only where the denominator z^{2} + 1 is zero. Since z^{2} + 1 = (z + i)(z − i), that happens only where z = i or z = −i. Only one of those points is in the region bounded by this contour. The residue of f(z) at z = i is
$$\lim_{z\to i}(z-i)f(z) = \lim_{z\to i}(z-i)\frac{e^{itz} }{ z^2+1} = \lim_{z\to i}(z-i)\frac{e^{itz} }{ (z-i)(z+i)} = \lim_{z\to i}\frac{e^{itz} }{ z+i} = \frac{e^{-t}}{2i}.$$

According to the residue theorem, then, we have
$$\int_C f(z)\,dz=2\pi i \operatorname{Res}_{z=i}f(z)=2\pi i\frac{e^{-t} }{ 2i}=\pi e^{-t}.$$

The contour C may be split into a "straight" part and a curved arc, so that
$$\int_\text{straight}+\int_\text{arc}=\pi e^{-t},$$
and thus
$$\int_{-a}^a =\pi e^{-t}-\int_\text{arc}.$$

According to Jordan's lemma, if t > 0 then
$$\int_\text{arc}\frac{e^{itz} }{ z^2+1}\,dz \rightarrow 0 \mbox{ as } a\rightarrow\infty.$$

Therefore, if t > 0 then
$$\int_{-\infty}^\infty \frac{e^{itx} }{ x^2+1}\,dx=\pi e^{-t}.$$

A similar argument with an arc that winds around −i rather than i shows that if t < 0 then
$$\int_{-\infty}^\infty \frac{e^{itx} }{ x^2+1}\,dx=\pi e^t,$$
and finally we have this:
$$\int_{-\infty}^\infty \frac{e^{itx} }{ x^2+1} \,dx=\pi e^{-|t|}.$$

(If t = 0 then the integral yields immediately to real-valued calculus methods and its value is π.)

=== Example 3 – trigonometric integrals ===
Certain substitutions can be made to integrals involving trigonometric functions, so the integral is transformed into a rational function of a complex variable and then the above methods can be used in order to evaluate the integral.

As an example, consider
$$\int_{-\pi}^\pi \frac{1 }{ 1 + 3 (\cos t)^2} \,dt.$$

We seek to make a substitution of z = e^{it}. Now, recall
$$\cos t = \frac12 \left(e^{it}+e^{-it}\right) = \frac12 \left(z+\frac{1}{z}\right)$$
and
$$\frac{dz}{dt} = iz,\ dt = \frac{dz}{iz}.$$

Taking C to be the unit circle, we substitute to get:
$$\begin{align}
\oint_C \frac{1}{ 1 + 3 \left(\frac12 \left(z+\frac{1}{z}\right)\right)^2} \,\frac{dz}{iz} &= \oint_C \frac{1 }{ 1 + \frac34 \left(z+\frac{1}{z}\right)^2}\frac{1}{iz} \,dz \\
&= \oint_C \frac{-i}{ z+\frac34 z\left(z+\frac{1}{z}\right)^2}\,dz \\
&= -i \oint_C \frac{dz}{ z+\frac34 z\left(z^2+2+\frac{1}{z^2}\right)} \\
&= -i \oint_C \frac{dz}{ z+\frac34 \left(z^3+2z+\frac{1}{z}\right)} \\
&= -i \oint_C \frac{dz}{ \frac34 z^3+\frac52 z+\frac{3}{4z}} \\
&= -i \oint_C \frac{4}{ 3z^3+10z+\frac{3}{z}}\,dz \\
&= -4i \oint_C \frac{dz}{ 3z^3+10z+\frac{3}{z}} \\
&= -4i \oint_C \frac{z}{ 3z^4+10z^2+3 } \,dz \\
&= -4i \oint_C \frac{z}{ 3\left(z+\sqrt{3}i\right)\left(z-\sqrt{3}i\right)\left(z+\frac{i}{\sqrt 3}\right)\left(z-\frac{i}{\sqrt 3}\right)}\,dz \\
&= -\frac{4i}{3} \oint_C \frac{z}{\left(z+\sqrt{3}i\right)\left(z-\sqrt{3}i\right)\left(z+\frac{i}{\sqrt 3}\right)\left(z-\frac{i}{\sqrt 3}\right)}\,dz.
\end{align}$$

The singularities to be considered are at $\tfrac{\pm i}{\sqrt{3}}.$ Let C_{1} be a small circle about $\tfrac{i}{\sqrt{3}},$ and C_{2} be a small circle about $\tfrac{-i}{\sqrt{3}}.$ Then we arrive at the following:
$$\begin{align}
& -\frac{4i}{3} \left [\oint_{C_1} \frac{\frac{z}{\left(z+\sqrt{3}i\right)\left(z-\sqrt{3}i\right)\left(z+\frac{i}{\sqrt 3} \right)}}{z-\frac{i}{\sqrt 3}}\,dz +\oint_{C_2} \frac{\frac{z}{\left(z+\sqrt{3}i\right)\left(z-\sqrt{3}i\right)\left(z-\frac{i}{\sqrt 3}\right)}}{z+\frac{i}{\sqrt 3}} \, dz \right ] \\
= {} & -\frac{4i}{3} \left[ 2\pi i \left[\frac{z}{\left(z+\sqrt{3}i\right)\left(z-\sqrt{3}i\right)\left(z+\frac{i}{\sqrt 3}\right)}\right]_{z=\frac{i}{\sqrt 3}} + 2\pi i \left[\frac{z}{\left(z+\sqrt{3}i\right)\left(z-\sqrt{3}i\right)\left(z-\frac{i}{\sqrt 3}\right)} \right]_{z=-\frac{i}{\sqrt 3}}\right] \\
= {} & \frac{8\pi}{3} \left[\frac{\frac{i}{\sqrt 3}}{\left(\frac{i}{\sqrt 3}+\sqrt{3}i\right)\left(\frac{i}{\sqrt 3}-\sqrt{3}i\right)\left(\frac{i}{\sqrt 3}+\frac{i}{\sqrt 3}\right)} + \frac{-\frac{i}{\sqrt 3}}{\left(-\frac{i}{\sqrt 3}+\sqrt{3}i\right)\left(-\frac{i}{\sqrt 3}-\sqrt{3}i\right)\left(-\frac{i}{\sqrt 3}-\frac{i}{\sqrt 3}\right)} \right] \\
= {} & \frac{8\pi}{3} \left[\frac{\frac{i}{\sqrt 3}}{\left(\frac{4}{\sqrt 3}i\right)\left(-\frac{2}{i\sqrt{3}}\right)\left(\frac{2}{\sqrt{3}i}\right)}+\frac{-\frac{i}{\sqrt 3}}{\left(\frac{2}{\sqrt 3}i\right)\left(-\frac{4}{\sqrt 3}i\right)\left(-\frac{2}{\sqrt 3}i\right)}\right] \\
= {} & \frac{8\pi}{3}\left[\frac{\frac{i}{\sqrt 3}}{i\left(\frac{4}{\sqrt 3}\right)\left(\frac{2}{\sqrt 3}\right)\left(\frac{2}{\sqrt 3}\right)}+\frac{-\frac{i}{\sqrt 3}}{-i\left(\frac{2}{\sqrt 3}\right)\left(\frac{4}{\sqrt 3}\right)\left(\frac{2}{\sqrt 3}\right)}\right] \\
= {} & \frac{8\pi}{3}\left[\frac{\frac{1}{\sqrt 3}}{\left(\frac{4}{\sqrt 3}\right)\left(\frac{2}{\sqrt 3}\right)\left(\frac{2}{\sqrt 3}\right)}+\frac{\frac{1}{\sqrt 3}}{\left(\frac{2}{\sqrt 3}\right)\left(\frac{4}{\sqrt 3}\right)\left(\frac{2}{\sqrt 3}\right)}\right] \\
= {} & \frac{8\pi}{3}\left[\frac{\frac{1}{\sqrt 3}}{\frac{16}{3\sqrt{3}}}+\frac{\frac{1}{\sqrt 3}}{\frac{16}{3\sqrt{3}}} \right] \\
= {} & \frac{8\pi}{3}\left[\frac{3}{16} + \frac{3}{16} \right] \\
= {} & \pi.
\end{align}$$

=== Example 3a – trigonometric integrals, the general procedure ===
The above method may be applied to all integrals of the type
$$\int_0^{2\pi} \frac{P\big(\sin(t),\sin(2t),\ldots,\cos(t),\cos(2t),\ldots\big)}{Q\big(\sin(t),\sin(2t),\ldots,\cos(t),\cos(2t),\ldots\big)}\, dt$$
where P and Q are polynomials, i.e. a rational function in trigonometric terms is being integrated. Note that the bounds of integration may as well be π and −π, as in the previous example, or any other pair of endpoints 2π apart.

The trick is to use the substitution z = e^{it} where dz = ie^{it} dt and hence
$$\frac{1}{iz} \,dz = dt.$$

This substitution maps the interval [0, 2π] to the unit circle. Furthermore,
$$\sin(k t) = \frac{e^{i k t} - e^{- i k t}}{2 i} = \frac{z^k - z^{-k}}{2i}$$
and
$$\cos(k t) = \frac{e^{i k t} + e^{- i k t}}{2} = \frac{z^k + z^{-k}}{2}$$
so that a rational function f(z) in z results from the substitution, and the integral becomes
$$\oint_{|z|=1} f(z) \frac{1}{iz}\, dz$$
which is in turn computed by summing the residues of f(z)1/iz inside the unit circle.

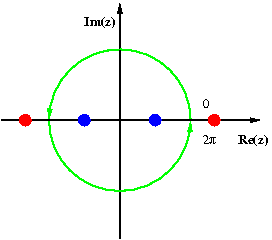

The image at right illustrates this for
$$I = \int_0^\frac{\pi}{2} \frac{1}{1 + (\sin t)^2}\, dt,$$
which we now compute. The first step is to recognize that
$$I = \frac14 \int_0^{2\pi} \frac{1}{1 + (\sin t)^2} \,dt.$$

The substitution yields
$$\frac{1}{4} \oint_{|z|=1} \frac{4 i z}{z^4 - 6z^2 + 1}\, dz = \oint_{|z|=1} \frac{i z}{z^4 - 6z^2 + 1}\, dz.$$

The poles of this function are at 1 ± √2 and −1 ± √2. Of these, 1 + √2 and −1 − √2 are outside the unit circle (shown in red, not to scale), whereas 1 − √2 and −1 + √2 are inside the unit circle (shown in blue). The corresponding residues are both equal to −i√2/16, so that the value of the integral is
$$I = 2 \pi i \; 2 \left( - \frac{\sqrt{2}}{16} i \right) = \pi \frac{\sqrt{2}}{4}.$$

=== Example 4 – branch cuts ===
Consider the real integral
$$\int_0^\infty \frac{\sqrt x}{x^2+6x+8}\,dx.$$

We can begin by formulating the complex integral
$$\int_C \frac{\sqrt z}{z^2+6z+8}\,dz=I.$$

We can use the Cauchy integral formula or residue theorem again to obtain the relevant residues. However, the important thing to note is that z^{1/2} = e^{(Log z)/2}, so z^{1/2} has a branch cut. This affects our choice of the contour C. Normally the logarithm branch cut is defined as the negative real axis, however, this makes the calculation of the integral slightly more complicated, so we define it to be the positive real axis.

Then, we use the so-called keyhole contour, which consists of a small circle about the origin of radius ε say, extending to a line segment parallel and close to the positive real axis but not touching it, to an almost full circle, returning to a line segment parallel, close, and below the positive real axis in the negative sense, returning to the small circle in the middle.

Note that z = −2 and z = −4 are inside the big circle. These are the two remaining poles, derivable by factoring the denominator of the integrand. The branch point at z = 0 was avoided by detouring around the origin.

Let γ be the small circle of radius ε, Γ the larger, with radius R, then
$$\int_C = \int_\varepsilon^R + \int_\Gamma + \int_R^\varepsilon + \int_\gamma.$$

It can be shown that the integrals over Γ and γ both tend to zero as ε → 0 and R → ∞, by an estimation argument above, that leaves two terms. Now since z^{1/2} = e^{(Log z)/2}, on the contour outside the branch cut, we have gained 2π in argument along γ. (By Euler's identity, e^{iπ} represents the unit vector, which therefore has π as its log. This π is what is meant by the argument of z. The coefficient of 1/2 forces us to use 2π.) So
$$\begin{align}
\int_R^\varepsilon \frac{\sqrt z}{z^2+6z+8}\,dz&=\int_R^\varepsilon \frac{e^{\frac12 \operatorname{Log} z}}{z^2+6z+8}\,dz \\[6pt]
&=\int_R^\varepsilon \frac{e^{\frac12(\log|z|+i \arg{z})}}{z^2+6z+8}\,dz \\[6pt]
& = \int_R^\varepsilon \frac{ e^{\frac12\log|z|}e^{\frac12(2\pi i)}}{z^2+6z+8}\,dz\\[6pt]
&=\int_R^\varepsilon \frac{ e^{\frac12\log|z|}e^{\pi i}}{z^2+6z+8}\,dz \\[6pt]
& = \int_R^\varepsilon \frac{-\sqrt z}{z^2+6z+8}\,dz\\[6pt]
&=\int_\varepsilon^R \frac{\sqrt z}{z^2+6z+8}\,dz.
\end{align}$$

Therefore:
$$\int_C \frac{\sqrt z}{z^2+6z+8}\,dz=2\int_0^\infty \frac{\sqrt x}{x^2+6x+8}\,dx.$$

By using the residue theorem or the Cauchy integral formula (first employing the partial fractions method to derive a sum of two simple contour integrals) one obtains
$$\pi i \left(\frac{i}{\sqrt 2}-i\right)=\int_0^\infty \frac{\sqrt x}{x^2+6x+8}\,dx = \pi\left(1-\frac{1}{\sqrt 2}\right).\quad\square$$

=== Example 5 – the square of the logarithm ===
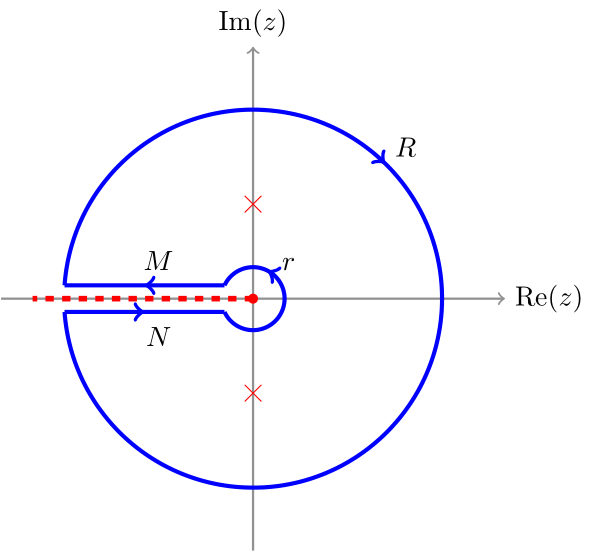

This section treats a type of integral of which
$$\int_0^\infty \frac{\log x}{\left(1+x^2\right)^2} \, dx$$
is an example.

To calculate this integral, one uses the function
$$f(z) = \left (\frac{\log z}{1+z^2} \right )^2$$
and the branch of the logarithm corresponding to −π < arg z ≤ π.

We will calculate the integral of f(z) along the keyhole contour shown at right. As it turns out this integral is a multiple of the initial integral that we wish to calculate and by the Cauchy residue theorem we have
$$\begin{align}
\left( \int_R + \int_M + \int_N + \int_r \right) f(z) \, dz
= &\  2 \pi i \big( \operatorname{Res}_{z=i} f(z) + \operatorname{Res}_{z=-i} f(z) \big) \\
= &\  2 \pi i \left( - \frac{\pi}{4} + \frac{1}{16} i \pi^2 - \frac{\pi}{4} - \frac{1}{16} i \pi^2 \right) \\
= &\  - i \pi^2. \end{align}$$

Let R be the radius of the large circle, and r the radius of the small one. We will denote the upper line by M, and the lower line by N. As before we take the limit when R → ∞ and r → 0. The contributions from the two circles vanish. For example, one has the following upper bound with the ML lemma:
$$\left| \int_R f(z) \, dz \right| \le 2 \pi R \frac{(\log R)^2 + \pi^2}{\left(R^2-1\right)^2} \to 0.$$

In order to compute the contributions of M and N we set z = −x + iε on M and z = −x − iε on N, with 0 < x < ∞:
$$\begin{align} -i \pi^2 &= \left( \int_R + \int_M + \int_N + \int_r \right) f(z) \, dz \\[6pt]
&= \left( \int_M + \int_N \right) f(z)\, dz && \int_R, \int_r \mbox{ vanish} \\[6pt]
&=-\int_\infty^0 \left (\frac{\log(-x + i\varepsilon)}{1+(-x + i\varepsilon)^2} \right )^2\, dx - \int_0^\infty \left (\frac{\log(-x - i\varepsilon)}{1+(-x - i\varepsilon)^2}\right)^2 \, dx \\[6pt]
&= \int_0^\infty \left (\frac{\log(-x + i\varepsilon)}{1+(-x + i\varepsilon)^2} \right )^2 \, dx - \int_0^\infty \left (\frac{\log(-x - i\varepsilon)}{1+(-x - i\varepsilon)^2} \right )^2 \, dx \\[6pt]
&= \int_0^\infty \left (\frac{\log x + i\pi}{1+x^2} \right )^2 \, dx - \int_0^\infty \left (\frac{\log x - i\pi}{1+x^2} \right )^2 \, dx && \varepsilon \to 0 \\
&= \int_0^\infty \frac{(\log x + i\pi)^2 - (\log x - i\pi)^2}{\left(1+x^2\right)^2} \, dx \\[6pt]
&= \int_0^\infty \frac{4 \pi i \log x}{\left(1+x^2\right)^2} \, dx \\[6pt]
&= 4 \pi i \int_0^\infty \frac{\log x}{\left(1+x^2\right)^2} \, dx \end{align}$$
which gives
$$\int_0^\infty \frac{\log x}{\left(1+x^2\right)^2} \, dx = - \frac{\pi}{4}.$$

=== Example 6 – logarithms and the residue at infinity ===
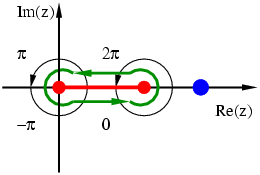

We seek to evaluate
$$I = \int_0^3 \frac{x^\frac34 (3-x)^\frac14}{5-x}\,dx.$$

This requires a close study of
$$f(z) = z^\frac34 (3-z)^\frac14.$$

We will construct f(z) so that it has a branch cut on [0, 3], shown in red in the diagram. To do this, we choose two branches of the logarithm, setting
$$z^\frac34 = \exp \left (\frac34 \log z \right ) \quad \mbox{where } -\pi \le \arg z < \pi$$
and
$$(3-z)^\frac14 = \exp \left (\frac14 \log(3-z) \right ) \quad \mbox{where } 0 \le \arg(3-z) < 2\pi.$$

The cut of z^{3/4} is therefore (−∞, 0] and the cut of (3 − z)^{1/4} is (−∞, 3]. It is easy to see that the cut of the product of the two, i.e. f(z), is [0, 3], because f(z) is actually continuous across (−∞, 0). This is because when z = −r < 0 and we approach the cut from above, f(z) has the value
$$r^\frac34 e^{\frac34 \pi i} (3+r)^\frac14 e^{\frac24 \pi i} = r^\frac34 (3+r)^\frac14 e^{\frac54 \pi i}.$$

When we approach from below, f(z) has the value
$$r^\frac34 e^{-\frac34 \pi i} (3+r)^\frac14 e^{\frac04 \pi i} = r^\frac34 (3+r)^\frac14 e^{-\frac34 \pi i}.$$

But
$$e^{-\frac34 \pi i} = e^{\frac54 \pi i},$$

so that we have continuity across the cut. This is illustrated in the diagram, where the two black oriented circles are labelled with the corresponding value of the argument of the logarithm used in z^{3/4} and (3 − z)^{1/4}.

We will use the contour shown in green in the diagram. To do this we must compute the value of f(z) along the line segments just above and just below the cut.

Let z = r (in the limit, i.e. as the two green circles shrink to radius zero), where 0 ≤ r ≤ 3. Along the upper segment, we find that f(z) has the value
$$r^\frac34 e^{\frac04 \pi i} (3-r)^\frac14 e^{\frac24 \pi i} = i r^\frac34 (3-r)^\frac14$$
and along the lower segment,
$$r^\frac34 e^{\frac04 \pi i} (3-r)^\frac14 e^{\frac04 \pi i} = r^\frac34 (3-r)^\frac14.$$

It follows that the integral of f(z)/(5 − z) along the upper segment is −iI in the limit, and along the lower segment, I.

If we can show that the integrals along the two green circles vanish in the limit, then we also have the value of I, by the Cauchy residue theorem. Let the radius of the green circles be ρ, where ρ < 0.001 and ρ → 0, and apply the ML inequality. For the circle C_{L} on the left, we find
$$\left| \int_{C_\mathrm{L}} \frac{f(z)}{5-z} dz \right| \le 2 \pi \rho \frac{\rho^\frac34 3.001^\frac14}{4.999} \in \mathcal{O} \left( \rho^\frac74 \right) \to 0.$$

Similarly, for the circle C_{R} on the right, we have
$$\left| \int_{C_\mathrm{R}} \frac{f(z)}{5-z} dz \right| \le 2 \pi \rho \frac{3.001^\frac34 \rho^\frac14}{1.999} \in \mathcal{O} \left( \rho^\frac54 \right) \to 0.$$

Now using the Cauchy residue theorem, we have
$$(-i + 1) I = -2\pi i \left( \operatorname{Res}_{z=5} \frac{f(z)}{5-z} + \operatorname{Res}_{z=\infty} \frac{f(z)}{5-z} \right).$$
where the minus sign is due to the clockwise direction around the residues. Using the branch of the logarithm from before, clearly
$$\operatorname{Res}_{z=5} \frac{f(z)}{5-z} = - 5^\frac34 e^{\frac14 \log(-2)}.$$

The pole is shown in blue in the diagram. The value simplifies to
$$-5^\frac34 e^{\frac14(\log 2 + \pi i)} = -e^{\frac14 \pi i} 5^\frac34 2^\frac14.$$

We use the following formula for the residue at infinity:
$$\operatorname{Res}_{z=\infty} h(z) = \operatorname{Res}_{z=0} \left(- \frac{1}{z^2} h\left(\frac{1}{z}\right)\right).$$

Substituting, we find
$$\frac{1}{5-\frac{1}{z}} = -z \left(1 + 5z + 5^2 z^2 + 5^3 z^3 + \cdots\right)$$
and
$$\left(\frac{1}{z^3}\left (3-\frac{1}{z} \right )\right)^\frac14 = \frac{1}{z} (3z-1)^\frac14 = \frac{1}{z}e^{\frac14 \pi i} (1-3z)^\frac14,$$
where we have used the fact that −1 = e^{πi} for the second branch of the logarithm. Next we apply the binomial expansion, obtaining
$$\frac{1}{z} e^{\frac14 \pi i} \left( 1 - {1/4 \choose 1} 3z + {1/4 \choose 2} 3^2 z^2 - {1/4 \choose 3} 3^3 z^3 + \cdots \right).$$

The conclusion is that
$$\operatorname{Res}_{z=\infty} \frac{f(z)}{5-z} = e^{\frac14 \pi i} \left (5 - \frac34 \right ) = e^{\frac14 \pi i}\frac{17}{4}.$$

Finally, it follows that the value of I is
$$I = 2 \pi i \frac{e^{\frac14 \pi i}}{-1+i} \left(\frac{17}{4} - 5^\frac34 2^\frac14 \right) = 2 \pi 2^{-\frac12} \left(\frac{17}{4} - 5^\frac34 2^\frac14 \right)$$
which yields
$$I = \frac{\pi}{2\sqrt 2} \left(17 - 5^\frac34 2^\frac94 \right) = \frac{\pi}{2\sqrt 2} \left(17 - 40^\frac34 \right).$$

== Evaluation with residue theorem ==
Using the residue theorem, we can evaluate closed contour integrals. The following are examples on evaluating contour integrals with the residue theorem.

Using the residue theorem, let us evaluate this contour integral.
$$\oint_C \frac{e^z}{z^3}\,dz$$

Recall that the residue theorem states
$$\oint_{C} f(z) dz=2\pi i\cdot \sum\operatorname{Res}(f,a_k) ,$$
where $\operatorname{Res}$ is the residue of $f(z)$, and the $a_k$ are the singularities of $f(z)$ lying inside the contour $C$ (with none of them lying directly on $C$).

$f(z)$ has only one pole, $0$. From that, we determine that the residue of $f(z)$ to be $\tfrac{1}{2}$
$$\begin{align}
\oint_C f(z) dz&=\oint_C \frac{e^z}{z^3}dz\\
&=2\pi i \cdot \operatorname{Res}_{z=0} f(z)\\
&=2\pi i\operatorname{Res}_{z=0} \frac{e^z}{z^3}\\
&=2\pi i \cdot \frac{1}{2}\\
&=\pi i
\end{align}$$

Thus, using the residue theorem, we can determine:
$$\oint_C \frac{e^z}{z^3} dz = \pi i.$$

== Integral representation ==
In complex analysis, an integral representation expresses a function as a contour integral in the complex plane. Such representations are central to the theory of holomorphic functions and are closely tied to the fundamental theorems of complex integration.

One of the most important examples is Cauchy's integral formula, which provides a way to reconstruct an analytic function from its values on a surrounding contour:

$f(z) = \frac{1}{2\pi i} \oint_\gamma \frac{f(\zeta)}{\zeta - z} \, d\zeta$

Where $f$ is a function holomorphic on and inside the simple closed contour $\gamma$, $z$ is a point inside $\gamma$, and $\zeta$ is the variable of integration. This formula shows that the values of $f$ inside the contour are determined by its values along the contour.

=== Examples ===
==== Inverse Laplace transform ====
The inverse Laplace transform is defined by a complex contour integral known as the Bromwich integral:
$$f(t) = \frac{1}{2\pi i} \int_{\gamma - i\infty}^{\gamma + i\infty} e^{st} F(s) \, ds$$

This integral expresses a function $f(t)$ in terms of its Laplace transform $F(s)$.

==== Gamma function ====
The Gamma function has the following integral representation:

$\Gamma(z) = \int_0^\infty t^{z-1} e^{-t} \, dt \quad \text{for } \operatorname{Re}(z) > 0$

Extensions of this definition involve contour integrals in the complex plane.

==== Riemann zeta function ====
The original definition of the Riemann zeta function $\zeta(s)$ via a Dirichlet series,
$$\zeta(s)=\sum^{\infty}_{k=1}\frac{1}{k^s} ,$$
is only valid for $\operatorname{Re}(s)>1$, but
$$\zeta(s)=\dfrac{\Gamma(1-s)}{2\pi i}\int_H \dfrac{(-t)^{s-1}}{e^{t}-1}dt ,$$
where the integration is done over the Hankel contour $H$, is valid for all complex $s$ not equal to $1$.

=== Applications ===
Integral representations are used to evaluate definite integrals, derive function identities, and solve differential equations. They also appear in complex asymptotic analysis, potential theory, and mathematical physics.

== See also ==
- Residue (complex analysis)
- Cauchy principal value
- Poisson integral
- Pochhammer contour
