= Limit comparison test =

Method of testing for the convergence of an infinite series

In mathematics, the limit comparison test (LCT) (in contrast with the related direct comparison test) is a method of testing for the convergence of an infinite series.

== Statement ==
Suppose that we have two series $\Sigma_n a_n$ and $\Sigma_n b_n$ with $a_n\geq 0, b_n > 0$ for all $n$. Then if $\lim_{n \to \infty} \frac{a_n}{b_n} = c$ with $0 < c < \infty$, then either both series converge or both series diverge.

== Proof ==
Because $\lim_{n \to \infty} \frac{a_n}{b_n} = c$ we know that for every $\varepsilon > 0$ there is a positive integer $n_0$ such that for all $n \geq n_0$ we have that $\left| \frac{a_n}{b_n} - c \right| < \varepsilon$, or equivalently

$$- \varepsilon < \frac{a_n}{b_n} - c < \varepsilon$$

$$c - \varepsilon < \frac{a_n}{b_n} < c + \varepsilon$$

$$(c - \varepsilon)b_n < a_n < (c + \varepsilon)b_n$$

As $c > 0$ we can choose $\varepsilon$ to be sufficiently small such that $c-\varepsilon$ is positive. So $b_n < \frac{1}{c-\varepsilon} a_n$ and by the direct comparison test, if $\sum_n a_n$ converges then so does $\sum_n b_n$.

Similarly $a_n < (c + \varepsilon)b_n$, so if $\sum_n a_n$ diverges, again by the direct comparison test, so does $\sum_n b_n$.

That is, both series converge or both series diverge.

== Example ==
We want to determine if the series $\sum_{n=1}^{\infty} \frac{1}{n^2 + 2n}$ converges. For this we compare it with the convergent series $\sum_{n=1}^{\infty} \frac{1}{n^2} = \frac{\pi^2}{6}$

As $\lim_{n \to \infty} \frac{1}{n^2 + 2n} \frac{n^2}{1} = 1 > 0$ we have that the original series also converges.

== One-sided version ==
One can state a one-sided comparison test by using limit superior. Let $a_n, b_n \geq 0$ for all $n$. Then if $\limsup_{n \to \infty} \frac{a_n}{b_n} = c$ with $0 \leq c < \infty$ and $\Sigma_n b_n$ converges, necessarily $\Sigma_n a_n$ converges.

== Example ==
Let $a_n = \frac{1-(-1)^n}{n^2}$ and $b_n = \frac{1}{n^2}$ for all natural numbers $n$. Now $\lim_{n\to\infty} \frac{a_n}{b_n} = \lim_{n\to\infty}(1-(-1)^n)$ does not exist, so we cannot apply the standard comparison test. However, $\limsup_{n\to\infty} \frac{a_n}{b_n} = \limsup_{n\to\infty}(1-(-1)^n) =2\in [0,\infty)$ and since $\sum_{n=1}^{\infty} \frac{1}{n^2}$ converges, the one-sided comparison test implies that $\sum_{n=1}^{\infty}\frac{1-(-1)^n}{n^2}$ converges.

== Converse of the one-sided comparison test ==
Let $a_n, b_n \geq 0$ for all $n$. If $\Sigma_n a_n$ diverges and $\Sigma_n b_n$ converges, then necessarily $\limsup_{n\to\infty} \frac{a_n}{b_n}=\infty$, that is, $\liminf_{n\to\infty} \frac{b_n}{a_n}= 0$. The essential content here is that in some sense the numbers $a_n$ are larger than the numbers $b_n$.

== Example ==
Let $f(z)=\sum_{n=0}^{\infty}a_nz^n$ be analytic in the unit disc $D = \{ z\in\mathbb{C} : |z|<1\}$ and have image of finite area. By Parseval's formula the area of the image of $f$ is proportional to $\sum_{n=1}^{\infty} n|a_n|^2$. Moreover, $\sum_{n=1}^{\infty} 1/n$ diverges. Therefore, by the converse of the comparison test, we have $\liminf_{n\to\infty} \frac{n|a_n|^2}{1/n}= \liminf_{n\to\infty} (n|a_n|)^2 = 0$, that is, $\liminf_{n\to\infty} n|a_n| = 0$.

== See also ==
- Convergence tests
- Direct comparison test
