= Glasser's master theorem =

Theorem in integral calculus

In integral calculus, Glasser's master theorem explains how a certain broad class of substitutions can simplify certain integrals over the whole real line from $-\infty$ to $+\infty.$ The integrals in question must be construed as Cauchy principal values, and a fortiori it is applicable when the integral converges absolutely. It is named after M. L. Glasser, who introduced it in 1983.

== A special case: the Cauchy–Schlömilch transformation ==
A special case called the Cauchy–Schlömilch substitution or Cauchy–Schlömilch transformation was known to Cauchy in the early 19th century. It states that for $a,b>0$,

$$\text{P.V.}\; \int_{-\infty}^\infty F\left(\left(ax-\frac{b}{x}\right)^2\right)\mathrm{d}x = \frac{1}{a}\cdot\text{P.V.} \int_{-\infty}^\infty F(x^2)\,\mathrm{d}x$$

where PV denotes the Cauchy principal value and $F$ is a function which is integrable on the real line at least in the sense of the Cauchy principal value.

== The master theorem ==
If $a$, $a_n$, and $b_n$ are real numbers and

$$\phi(x) = x - a - \sum_{n=1}^N \frac{|a_n|}{x-b_n}$$

then

$$\operatorname{P.V.} \int_{-\infty}^\infty F(\phi(x))\,\mathrm{d}x = \operatorname{P.V.} \int_{-\infty}^\infty F(x)\,\mathrm{d}x.$$

== Examples ==
$$\begin{align} \int_{-\infty}^\infty \frac{x^2}{x^4+1}\,\mathrm{d}x
&=\int_{-\infty}^\infty
\frac{\mathrm{d}x}{x^2+\frac{1}{x^2}} \\
&= \int_{-\infty}^\infty \frac{\mathrm{d}x}{\left( x-\frac 1 x \right)^2 + 2} \\
&= \int_{-\infty}^\infty \frac{\mathrm{d}x}{x^2 + 2} \\
&=\lim_{n\rightarrow \infty }{{\left[\frac{1}{\sqrt{2}}\arctan{\left(\frac{x}{\sqrt{2}}\right)}\right]}_{-n}^{n}}
&=\frac \pi {\sqrt 2}
\end{align}$$

where the first equality comes from cancelling $x^2$, the second from Cauchy–Schlömilch, and the last one from a substitution and the integral of the arctangent function.
