= Gauss–Lucas theorem =

Geometric relation between the roots of a polynomial and those of its derivative

In complex analysis, a branch of mathematics, the Gauss–Lucas theorem gives a geometric relation between the roots of a polynomial P and the roots of its derivative P′. The set of roots of a real or complex polynomial is a set of points in the complex plane. The theorem states that the roots of P′ all lie within the convex hull of the roots of P, that is the smallest convex polygon containing the roots of P. When P has a single root then this convex hull is a single point and when the roots lie on a line then the convex hull is a segment of this line. The Gauss–Lucas theorem, named after Carl Friedrich Gauss and Félix Lucas, is similar in spirit to Rolle's theorem.

Illustration of Gauss–Lucas theorem, displaying the evolution of the roots of the derivatives of a polynomial.

== Formal statement ==
If P is a (nonconstant) polynomial with complex coefficients, all zeros of P′ belong to the convex hull of the set of zeros of P.

== Special cases ==
It is easy to see that if $P(x) = ax^2+bx+c$ is a second degree polynomial, the zero of $P'(x) = 2ax+b$ is the average of the roots of P. In that case, the convex hull is the line segment with the two roots as endpoints and it is clear that the average of the roots is the middle point of the segment.

For a third degree complex polynomial P (cubic function) with three distinct zeros, Marden's theorem states that the zeros of P′ are the foci of the Steiner inellipse which is the unique ellipse tangent to the midpoints of the triangle formed by the zeros of P.

For a fourth degree complex polynomial P (quartic function) with four distinct zeros forming a concave quadrilateral, one of the zeros of P lies within the convex hull of the other three; all three zeros of P′ lie in two of the three triangles formed by the interior zero of P and two other zeros of P.

In addition, if a polynomial of degree n of real coefficients has n distinct real zeros $x_1<x_2<\cdots < x_n$, we see, using Rolle's theorem, that the zeros of the derivative polynomial are in the interval $[x_1,x_n]$ which is the convex hull of the set of roots.

The convex hull of the roots of the polynomial
$$p_n x^n+p_{n-1}x^{n-1}+\cdots +p_0$$
particularly includes the point
$$-\frac{p_{n-1}}{n\cdot p_n}.$$

== Proof ==
Proof

By the fundamental theorem of algebra, $P$ is a product of linear factors as
$$P(z)= \alpha \prod_{i=1}^n (z-a_i)$$
where the complex numbers $a_1, a_2, \ldots, a_n$ are the – not necessarily distinct – zeros of the polynomial P, the complex number α is the leading coefficient of P and n is the degree of P.

For any root $z$ of $P'$, if it is also a root of $P$, then the theorem is trivially true. Otherwise, we have for the logarithmic derivative
$$0 =  \frac{P^\prime(z)}{P(z)} = \sum_{i=1}^n \frac{1}{z-a_i} = \sum_{i=1}^n \frac{\overline{z}-\overline{a_i}} {|z-a_i|^2}.$$

Hence
$$\sum_{i=1}^n \frac{\overline{z} } {|z-a_i|^2} = \sum_{i=1}^n \frac{\overline{a_i} } {|z-a_i|^2}.$$

Taking their conjugates, and dividing, we obtain $z$ as a convex sum of the roots of $P$:
$$z = \sum_{i=1}^n \frac{|z-a_i|^{-2}}{ \sum_{j=1}^n |z-a_j|^{-2}} a_i$$

== See also ==
- Marden's theorem
- Bôcher's theorem
- Sendov's conjecture
- Routh–Hurwitz theorem
- Hurwitz's theorem (complex analysis)
- Descartes's rule of signs
- Rouché's theorem
- Properties of polynomial roots
- Cauchy interlacing theorem
