= Maxime Bôcher =

American mathematician (1867–1918)

- Born: August 28, 1867; Boston, Massachusetts, U.S.
- Died: September 12, 1918 (aged 51); Cambridge, Massachusetts, U.S.
- Education: Harvard University; University of Göttingen
- Known for: Differential equations, series, and algebra
- Scientific career
- Fields: Mathematics
- Workplaces: Harvard University
- Doctoral advisor: Felix Klein
- Doctoral students: William Brenke; David R. Curtiss; Griffith C. Evans; Lester R. Ford; Walter B. Ford; James W. Glover; Charles N. Moore; William H. Roever; Joseph L. Walsh

Maxime Bôcher (August 28, 1867 – September 12, 1918) was an American mathematician who published about 100 papers on differential equations, series, and algebra. He also wrote elementary texts such as Trigonometry and Analytic Geometry. Bôcher's theorem, Bôcher's equation, and the Bôcher Memorial Prize are named after him.

== Life ==
Bôcher was born in Boston, Massachusetts. His parents were Caroline Little and Ferdinand Bôcher]. Maxime's father was professor of modern languages at the Massachusetts Institute of Technology when Maxime was born, and became professor of French at Harvard University in 1872.

Bôcher graduated from the Cambridge Latin School in 1883. He received his first degree from Harvard in 1888. At Harvard, he studied topics including mathematics, Latin, chemistry, philosophy, zoology, geography, geology, meteorology, Roman art, and music.

Bôcher was awarded academic prizes, which allowed him to travel to Europe to do research. The University of Göttingen was then the leading mathematics university, and he attended there lectures by Felix Klein, Arthur Moritz Schoenflies, Hermann Schwarz, Issai Schur and Woldemar Voigt. He was awarded a doctorate in 1891 for his dissertation Über die Reihenentwicklungen der Potentialtheorie (German for "On the Development of the Potential Function into Series"); he was encouraged to study this topic by Klein. He received a Göttingen university prize for this work.

Bocher was elected to the American Academy of Arts and Sciences in 1899, the United States National Academy of Sciences in 1909, and the American Philosophical Society in 1916.

In Göttingen he met Marie Niemann, and they were married in July 1891. They had three children. He returned with his wife to Harvard where he was appointed as an instructor. In 1894 he was promoted to assistant professor. He became a full professor of mathematics in 1904. He was president of the American Mathematical Society from 1908 to 1910.

He died at his Cambridge home aged 51 after suffering a prolonged illness.

== Bôcher's theorem ==
Bôcher's theorem states that the finite zeros of the derivative $r'(z)$ of a non-constant rational function $r(z)$ that are not multiple zeros of $r(z)$ are the positions of equilibrium in the field of force due to particles of positive mass at the zeros of $r(z)$ and particles of negative mass at the poles of $r(z)$, with masses numerically equal to the respective multiplicities, where each particle repels with a force equal to the mass times the inverse distance.

== Bôcher's equation ==
Bôcher's equation is a second-order ordinary differential equation of the form:

$$y'' + \frac{1}{2} \left [\frac{m_1}{x-a_1}+ \cdots +\frac{m_{n-1}}{x-a_{n-1}} \right] y' + \frac{1}{4} \left[\frac{A_0+A_1x+ \cdots +A_\ell x^\ell}{(x-a_1)^m_1 (x-a_2)^m_2 \cdots (x-a_{n-1})^m_{n-1}} \right]y = 0.$$

== The Bôcher Memorial Prize ==
The Bôcher Memorial Prize is awarded by the American Mathematical Society every five years for notable research in analysis that has appeared in a recognized North American journal.

Winners have included James W. Alexander II (1928), Eric Temple Bell (1924), George D. Birkhoff (1923), Paul J. Cohen (1964), Solomon Lefschetz (1924), Marston Morse and Norbert Wiener (1933), and John von Neumann (1938).

== Works ==
- 1894: Ueber die Reihenentwicklungen der Potentialtheorie via Internet Archive
- 1900: "Randwertaufgaben bei Gewöhnlich Differentialgleichung", Encyclopädie der mathematischen Wissenschaften Band 2–1–1.
- 1907: (with E.P.R.DuVal) Introduction to Higher Algebra via HathiTrust
- 1909: Introduction to the study of Integral Equations via Internet Archive
- 1917: Leçons sur les méthodes de Sturm dans la théorie des équations différentielles linéaires et leurs développements modernes via Internet Archive.

Bôcher was one of the editors of the Annals of Mathematics and of the Transactions of the American Mathematical Society.
