= Hurwitz's theorem =

Hurwitz's theorem can refer to several theorems named after Adolf Hurwitz:

- Hurwitz's theorem (complex analysis)
- Riemann–Hurwitz formula in algebraic geometry
- Hurwitz's theorem (composition algebras) on quadratic forms and nonassociative algebras
- Hurwitz's automorphisms theorem on Riemann surfaces
- Hurwitz's theorem (number theory)
