= Bôcher's theorem =

In mathematics, Bôcher's theorem is either of two theorems named after the American mathematician Maxime Bôcher.

== Bôcher's theorem in complex analysis ==
In complex analysis, the theorem states that the finite zeros of the derivative $r'(z)$ of a non-constant rational function $r(z)$ that are not multiple zeros are also the positions of equilibrium in the field of force due to particles of positive mass at the zeros of $r(z)$ and particles of negative mass at the poles of $r(z)$, with masses numerically equal to the respective multiplicities, where each particle repels with a force equal to the mass times the inverse distance.

Furthermore, if C_{1} and C_{2} are two disjoint circular regions which contain respectively all the zeros and all the poles of $r(z)$, then C_{1} and C_{2} also contain all the critical points of $r(z)$.

== Bôcher's theorem for harmonic functions ==
In the theory of harmonic functions, Bôcher's theorem states that a positive harmonic function in a punctured domain (an open domain minus one point in the interior) is a linear combination of a harmonic function in the unpunctured domain with a scaled fundamental solution for the Laplacian in that domain.

== See also ==
- Marden's theorem
