= Edwin F. Beckenbach =

American mathematician

Edwin Ford Beckenbach
- Born: July 18, 1906; Oak Cliff, Dallas County, Texas, U.S.
- Died: September 5, 1982 (aged 76); Syracuse, New York, U.S.
- Education: Rice University
- Known for: Inequalities
- Spouse(s): Madelene Shelby Simons (m. 1933; div. 1960), Alice Judson Curtiss (m. 1960)
- Children: 1 son, 2 daughters
- Scientific career
- Fields: Mathematics
- Workplaces: University of Michigan, Rice University, UCLA, Rand Corporation
- Doctoral advisor: Lester R. Ford

Edwin Ford Beckenbach (July 18, 1906 – September 5, 1982) was an American mathematician.

== Biography ==
Beckenbach was born July 18, 1906, in Oak Cliff, Dallas County, Texas, the son of a leather worker and on his father's side the grandson of immigrants from Germany. In 1924, he began study at Rice University, where in 1929 he earned a master's degree and in 1931 a PhD under the direction of Lester R. Ford. As a postdoc, he was a National Research Fellow at Princeton University, Ohio State University, and the University of Chicago. In 1933, he was an instructor at Rice University and from 1940 an assistant professor at the University of Michigan. In 1942, Beckenbach became an associate professor at the University of Texas and was from 1945 a professor at UCLA. At UCLA, he led the development of the graduate program in mathematics. The first mathematics PhD was granted under his direction as thesis advisor.

Beckenbach was also a leader in the founding (in 1948) of the Institute of Numerical Analysis, which was then a branch of the National Bureau of Standards. His institute developed in 1948 and 1949 a vacuum-tube computer (SWAC), which began operation in July 1950 and was for a short time the fastest computer in the world. In 1974 he retired from UCLA as professor emeritus. From 1949 to 1963, he was a consultant for the Rand Corporation and in the academic year 1951/1952 he was a visiting professor at the Institute for Advanced Study.

In the academic year 1958/59 he was a Guggenheim Fellow at ETH Zürich. With František Wolf, Beckenbach founded in 1951 the Pacific Journal of Mathematics, of which he was the first editor. In 1983, he received the Distinguished Service Award from the Mathematical Association of America. The Beckenbach Book Prize, first awarded in January 1985, is named in his honor.

Beckenbach was famous for his work on inequalities and for this subject organized three Oberwolfach seminars (in 1976, 1978, and 1981). He was a co-author of several college textbooks in mathematics, including algebra, trigonometry, and analytic geometry.

From 1933 to 1960, he was married to Madelene Shelby Simons and had from this marriage a son and two daughters. In 1960, the marriage ended in divorce and in the same year he married his second wife Alice Judson Curtiss.

He died on September 5, 1982, in Syracuse, New York.

== Works ==
- Concepts of Communication, Krieger 1971
- Inequalities, Ergebnisse der Mathematik, Springer Verlag, 1st edn. 1961 with Richard E. Bellman, 2nd edn. 1965, 1971
- with Richard Bellman: Introduction to Inequalities, Random House 1961
- Editor: Modern Mathematics for the Engineer, McGraw Hill 1957
- Editor: Applied combinatorial mathematics, Wiley 1964

== Sources ==
- M. Goldberg: In memoriam: Edwin F. Beckenbach, in General Inequalities 4, Oberwolfach 1983, Basel, Birkhäuser, 1984
