= Edward B. Saff =

American mathematician

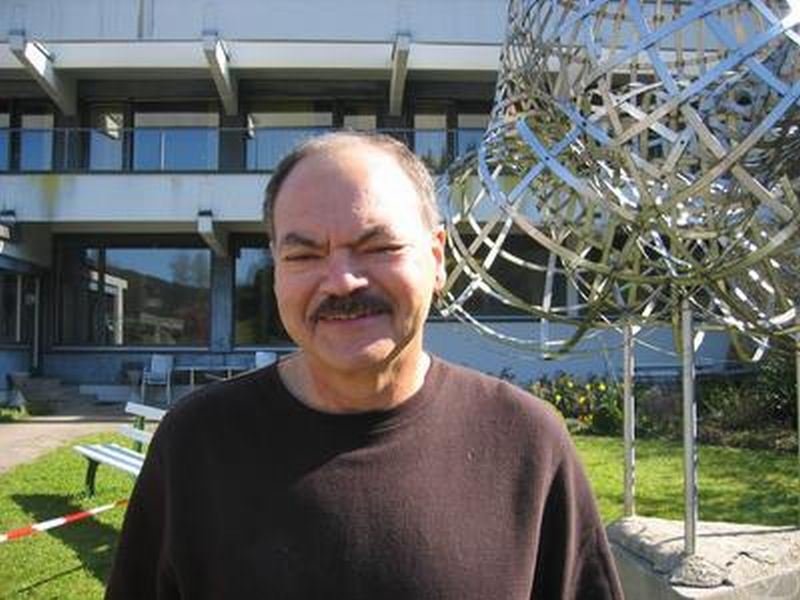
Edward Saff 2007

Edward Barry Saff (born 2 January 1944 in New York City) is an American mathematician, specializing in complex analysis, approximation theory, numerical analysis, and potential theory.

== Education and career ==
Saff received in 1964 his bachelor's degree from the Georgia Institute of Technology and in 1968 his PhD from the University of Maryland, College Park under Joseph L. Walsh with thesis Interpolation and Functions of Class H (k, a, 2). As a postdoc he was a Fulbright Fellow at Imperial College London from 1968 to 1969. At the University of South Florida he was from 1969 to 1971 an assistant professor, from 1971 to 1976 an associate professor, from 1976 to 1986 a full professor, and from 1986 to 2001 a distinguished research professor. At Vanderbilt University he is, since 2001, a professor and director of the Center for Constructive Approximation and was from 2004 to 2007 the Executive Dean of the College of Arts and Sciences.

His research deals with approximation of complex functions by polynomials and rational functions, approximate solutions of differential equations, Padé approximants, geometry of polynomials, special functions, Hardy spaces, conformal mappings (including numerical analysis). and potential theory (minima of energy under boundary value constraints or external fields). He is the author or coauthor of over 240 research articles, the coauthor of 9 books, and the coeditor of 11 volumes. He was the coeditor, with Theodore J. Rivlin, of a volume of Joseph L. Walsh's Selected Works published in 2000. Since 2007 he is an ISI Highly Cited Researcher.

For the academic year 1978–1979 Saff was a Guggenheim Fellow at the University of Oxford. In 2012 he was elected a Fellow of the American Mathematical Society. He was elected in 2013 a Foreign Member of the Bulgarian Academy of Sciences and made in 1987 an Honorary Professor of the Zhejiang Normal University in China.

== Selected publications ==
=== Books as author ===
- with A. D. Snider: Fundamentals of Complex Analysis, Prentice Hall 1976, 3rd edition, 2003
- with A. W. Goodman: Calculus: Concepts and Calculations, Macmillan 1981
- with A. Edrei and R. S. Varga: Zeros of Sections of Power Series, Lecture Notes in Mathematics 1002, Springer-Verlag, Berlin, 1983.
- with R. K. Nagle: Fundamentals of Differential Equations, Benjamin-Cummings 1986, 8th edition 2012 (later editions with A. D. Snider)
- with R. K. Nagle: Fundamentals of Differential Equations and Boundary Value Problems, Addison-Wesley 1993, 6th Edition 2012 (later editions with A. D. Snider)
- with D. S. Lubinsky: Strong Asymptotics for Extremal Polynomials Associated with Weights on $R$, Lecture Notes in Mathematics 1305, Springer-Verlag, Berlin, 1988.
- with Vilmos Totik: Logarithmic potentials with external fields, Grundlehren der mathematischen Wissenschaften 316, Springer 1997
- with A. D. Snider: Fundamentals of Matrix Analysis with Applications, Wiley 2016

=== Books as editor ===
- with A. A. Gonchar: Approximation Theory in Complex Analysis and Mathematical Physics: A Workshop held at the Euler International Mathematical Institute, Leningrad, Spring 1991, Lecture Notes in Mathematics 1550, Springer-Verlag 1993
- with Stefan Ruscheweyh, L. Salinas, and Richard S. Varga: Computational Methods and Function Theory, Lecture Notes in Mathematics 1435, Springer-Verlag, Berlin, 1990.
- Approximation Theory, Tampa, Lecture Notes in Mathematics 1287, Springer-Verlag, Berlin, 1987.
- with P. R. Graves-Morris and R. S. Varga: Rational Approximation and Interpolation, Lecture Notes in Mathematics 1105, Springer-Verlag, Berlin 1984.
- with N. Papamichael and St. Ruscheweyh: Computational Methods and Function Theory 1997, World Scientific, 1999.
- with R. S. Varga: Padé and Rational Approximation: Theory and Application, Academic Press, New York, 1977. Safe, E. B. (2013-05-09). 2013 pbk reprint. Elsevier. ISBN 9780323147774.
