= Jacques Rouché =

French art and music patron

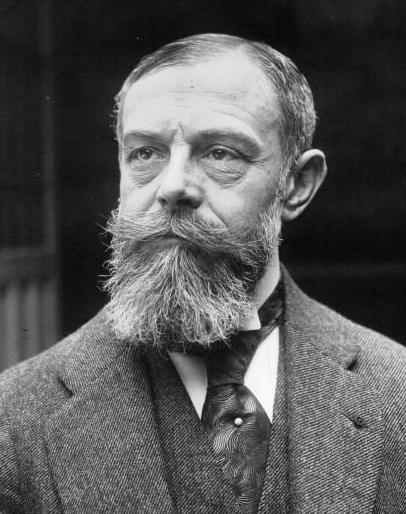
Jacques Rouché (1914)

Jacques Louis Eugène Rouché (16 November 1862, Lunel - 9 November 1957, Paris) was a French art and music patron. He was the owner of the journal La Grande Revue and manager of the Théâtre des Arts and the Paris Opera.

== Biography ==
He was born to a Protestant family. His father, Eugène, was a mathematician who devised what is now known as Rouché's theorem. After studies at the École Polytechnique and the Institut d'études politiques de Paris, he worked for several different ministries and was appointed head of security at the Exposition Universelle (1889).

He always had a passion for the theater and began writing comedies while still in school. In 1891, he travelled to Vienna, Budapest and Bayreuth to get a first-hand look at the workings of professional theaters. In 1893, however, his career took an unexpected turn when he married Berthe Piver, heiress to the L.T. Piver perfumery, and he soon became an entrepreneur. First, he worked to modernize the company by holding a competition for young chemical engineers who would later develop some of the first synthetic fragrances. He then introduced scented sample cards and slowly expanded the company, opening branches as far-flung as New York, Buenos Aires and Hong Kong. Eventually, half the company's product was exported. After he had amassed a small fortune, he became a patron of the arts.

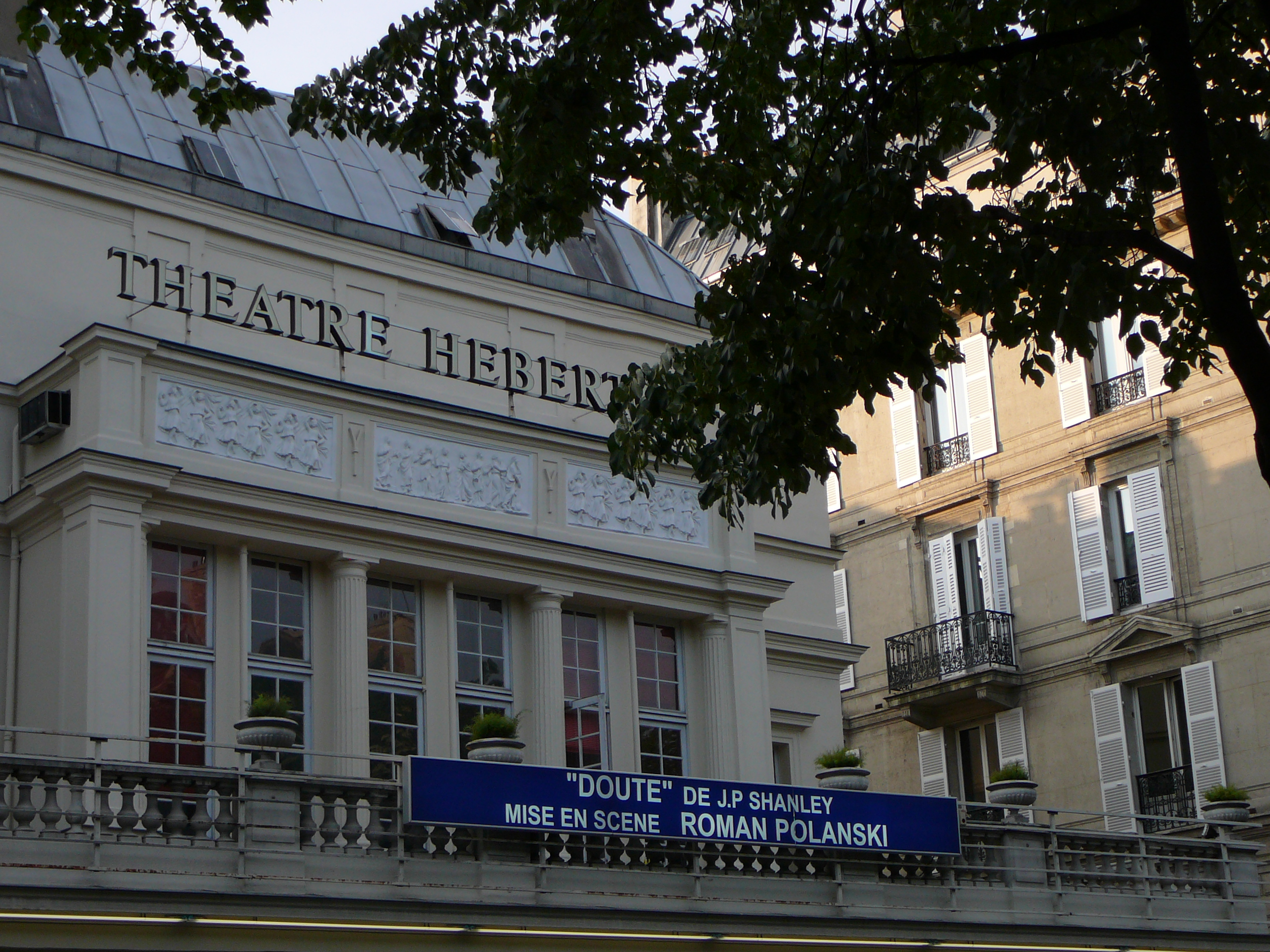
Théâtre des Arts, now the Théâtre Hébertot

In 1907, he acquired La Grande Revue, a legal publication founded in 1897 by Fernand Labori (who had been defense counsel for Lucy Dreyfus and Émile Zola) and turned it into a cultural journal. He published essays, critiques, short stories and theatrical pieces by Gide, D'Annunzio, Shaw and many others. His regular contributors included Maurice Denis and George Desvallières (painting), Jacques Copeau (theater), Romain Rolland (music), André Suarès (literature) and Gaston Doumergue (politics). It was published bimonthly until 1940.

=== Théâtre des Arts ===
In 1910, he rented the Théâtre des Arts (now the Théâtre Hébertot) for three seasons. Although a novice, he quickly assembled a troop; presenting ballets and operas as well as drama and comedy. He also applied his theories of set decoration, which he had described in his long essay L’Art théâtral moderne, by engaging painters who had never worked in the theater before; notably Maxime Dethomas, André Dunoyer de Segonzac, Charles Guérin and André Hellé.

One of his greatest successes was Jacques Copeau's adaptation of Dostoevsky's The Brothers Karamazov in 1911.^{:498} This was the production in which Copeau, Charles Dullin and Louis Jouvet would intersect for the first time, with Dullin playing the role of Smerdiakov, and Jouvet portraying Father Zossima.^{:75} The 1912 season was devoted to dance, featuring works by d'Indy, Schmitt, Dukas and Ravel.

=== The Paris Opera ===
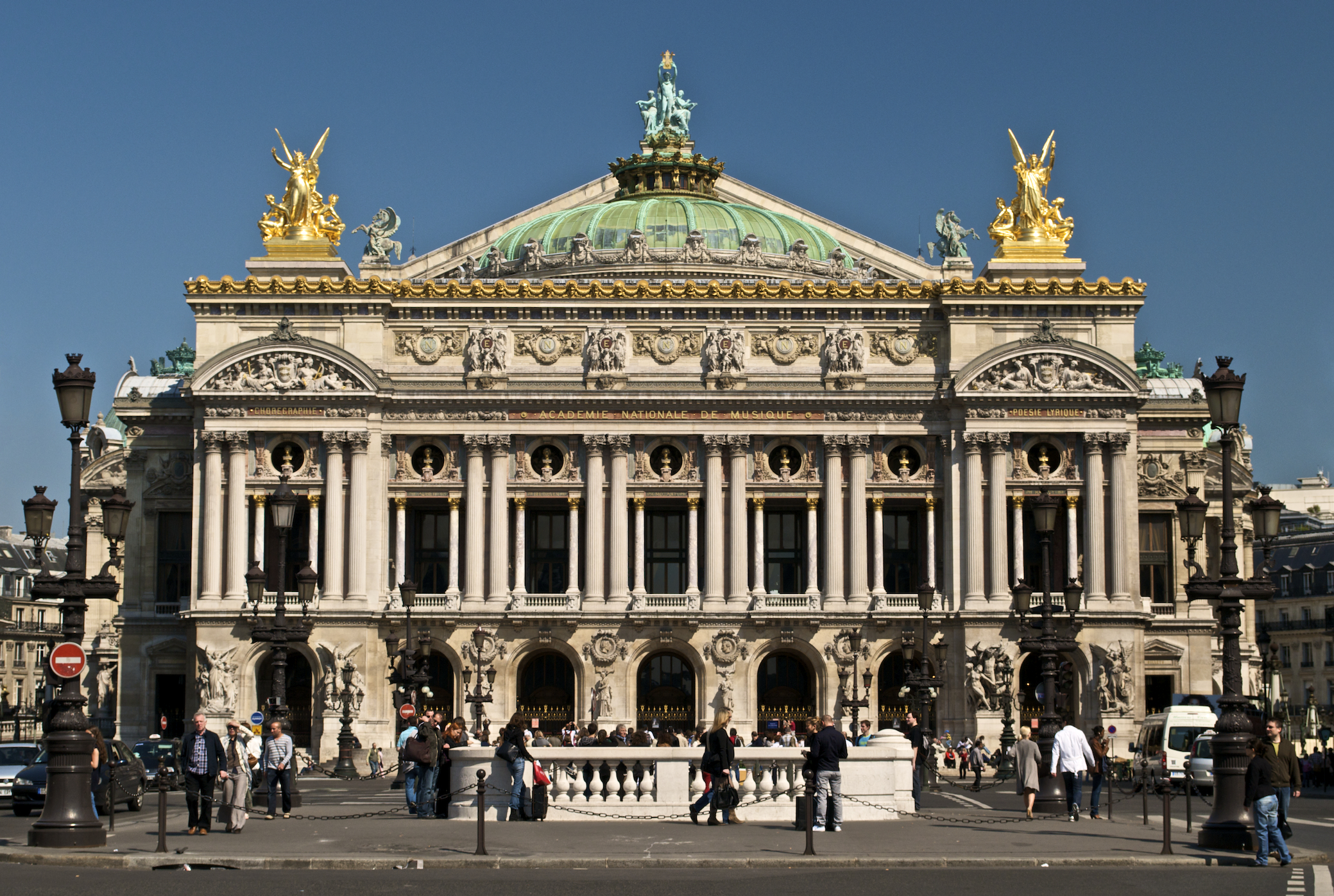
Palais Garnier, home of the Paris Opera

His work attracted the attention of officials in the French government who were looking to replace André Messager as head of the Paris Opera. When his appointment was announced in the Journal officiel of November 1913, it was greeted with some derision. A few critics claimed that he was chosen simply because his wealth would help the Opera overcome its chronic deficits. In fact, during the thirty years of his tenure, he contributed over 20 million Francs of his own money to keep the Opera functioning and came close to resigning over the issue in 1932.

In 1914, he undertook a tour of the major European opera halls, meeting with managers, directors, engineers, designers and composers to seek their advice. He formally took office in September 1914, when the Palais Garnier closed its doors due to the war and remained closed for eighteen months. After much difficulty, he was finally able to present a short ballet by Igor Stravinsky called The Bees. During the war, he presented several Baroque operas that met with little success.

After the war, he turned to contemporary works by French and foreign composers, such as Honegger, Poulenc, Strauss and Prokofiev. In 1924, he was elected to a seat at the Académie des Beaux-Arts and named a Commander in the Legion of Honor. Following the dissolution of the Ballets Russes, he obtained the appointment of Serge Lifar as master of the Paris Opera Ballet in 1930, restoring dance to its former place of importance there.

Despite Rouché's best efforts, the deficits continued to worsen and, by 1936, it was clear that major reforms were needed. In 1939, at the suggestion of Jean Zay, the French government created the "Réunion des théâtres lyriques nationaux" (RTLN), which combined the Paris Opera with the Opéra-Comique and made them government agencies, relieving them from the need of trying to make a profit. Rouché became the overall administrator of the new organization with Philippe Gaubert directing the Opera and Henri Büsser managing the Opéra-Comique.

=== The occupation and after ===
During the Occupation, the Vichy Government sought to control the Opera, while Rouché and his associates fought to retain some independence. Most of the members of the company and the orchestra had sought refuge in Cahors, but were ordered back to Paris in July 1940. Rouché, already past retirement at 78 years old, wanted to give up his position but was convinced to stay by his staff, who feared that a Nazi administrator might replace him.

During this time, he focused on operas from the classical French repertoire (Berlioz, Massenet, Gounod and the like) but had to placate German authorities; offering appearances by the Berlin Philharmonic and presentations of Wagnerian operas. He also fought a constant battle to keep the Jewish members of his staff, paying their wages himself after they were officially dismissed.

Following Liberation, he was called upon to explain his actions during the war because they were considered to have been too conciliatory. Although his staff and various union members testified on his behalf, he was relieved of his position in January 1945. He remained active in cultural affairs and, in 1951, was rehabilitated; becoming the honorary director of the RTLN. He died at his mansion in 1957, aged ninety-five.

In 2007, the Bibliothèque nationale de France organized an exposition in his honor, called "La modernité à l’Opéra : Jacques Rouché (1914–1945)".
