= Robert Everist Greene =

American mathematician at UCLA (born 1943)

- Born: 1943 (age 82–83)
- Education: Michigan State University, University of California, Berkeley
- Spouse: Paige Greene
- Scientific career
- Fields: Mathematics
- Workplaces: University of California, Los Angeles
- Doctoral advisor: Hung-Hsi Wu

Robert Everist Greene (born 1943) is an American mathematician who contributed to differential geometry and several complex variables. He is currently a Professor of Mathematics at the University of California, Los Angeles.

Greene was an undergraduate at Michigan State University and a Putnam Fellow in 1963. He went to Princeton briefly, then completed his Ph.D. at the University of California, Berkeley in 1969. His doctoral advisor was Hung-Hsi Wu; his doctoral thesis was titled Isometric Embeddings of Riemannian and Pseudo-Riemannian Manifolds.

== Personal life ==
Greene is also an amateur violinist, and was the violin instructor of Russell Crowe for the 2003 epic period war-drama film Master and Commander: The Far Side of the World. In his Princeton years, he played violin with Hassler Whitney, one of the founders of the subject differential topology, who was a violin and viola player.

== Bibliography ==
Some of Greene's books and papers are:

Greene, Robert (1970). Isometric embeddings of Riemannian and pseudo-Riemannian manifolds. AMS. ISBN 978-0-8218-1297-6.

- Function theory of One Complex Variable (Graduate Studies in Mathematics 40)
- Differential Geometry
- The Automorphism Groups Of Domains
- Function Theory On Manifolds Which Possess A Pole
- Introduction to Topology (with Theodore Gamelin)
- Several Complex Variables and Complex Geometry
