= Theodore Gamelin =

American mathematician

Theodore William Gamelin
- Born: 1939
- Title: Professor Emeritus of Mathematics

Academic background
- Education: University of California, Berkeley
- Thesis: The extension problem for restrictions of functions in a subspace of c(x) (1963)
- Doctoral advisor: František Wolf

Academic work
- Discipline: Mathematics
- Doctoral students: Bernt Øksendal
- Main interests: Function algebras, complex analysis
- Website: www.math.ucla.edu/~twg/

Theodore William Gamelin is an American mathematician. He is a professor emeritus of mathematics at the University of California, Los Angeles.

Gamelin was born in 1939. He received his B.S. degree in mathematics from Yale University in 1960, and completed his Ph.D. at the University of California, Berkeley in 1963. His doctoral advisor was František Wolf. His doctoral dissertation was titled The extension problem for restrictions of functions in a subspace of C(X). He served as C.L.E. Moore Instructor at the Massachusetts Institute of Technology from 1963 to 1965, before joining the UCLA faculty.

In 2012, he became one of the inaugural Fellows of the American Mathematical Society.

== Selected publications ==
- Complex Analysis. New York, NY: Springer. 2001-05-18. ISBN 978-0-387-95093-8. MR 1830078.
- with Lennart Carleson: Complex Dynamics. New York Berlin Heidelberg: Springer. 1996-02-02. ISBN 978-0-387-97942-7. MR 1230383.
- with Robert Everist Greene: Introduction to Topology. Dover Publications. 1999-01-01. ISBN 978-0-486-40680-0. MR 1700747.
- Uniform Algebras and Jensen Measures. Cambridge: Cambridge University Press. 1978. ISBN 978-0-521-22280-8. MR 0521440.
- Uniform Algebras. Englewood Cliffs/N.J: Prentice-Hall. 1969. ISBN 978-0-13-937805-8.
