= Eugène Rouché =

French mathematician (1832–1910)

- Born: 18 August 1832; Sommières, Gard, France
- Died: 19 August 1910 (aged 78); Lunel, Hérault
- Education: École Polytechnique
- Known for: Rouché's theorem, Rouché–Capelli theorem
- Scientific career
- Fields: Mathematics
- Workplaces: Charlemagne Lyceum, École Centrale
- Thesis: Sur les intégrales communes à plusieurs problèmes de mécanique relatifs au mouvement d'un point sur une surface (1858)

Eugène Rouché (18 August 1832 – 19 August 1910) was a French mathematician.

== Career ==
He was an alumnus of the École Polytechnique, which he entered in 1852. He went on to become professor of mathematics at the Charlemagne lyceum then at the École Centrale, and admissions examiner at his alma mater. He is best known for Rouché's theorem in complex analysis, which he published in his alma mater's institutional journal in 1862, and for the Rouché–Capelli theorem in linear algebra.

His son, Jacques, was a noted patron of the arts who managed the Paris Opera for thirty years (1914–1944).

== See also ==
- Rouché's theorem
- Rouché–Capelli theorem
