= William Henry Roever =

American mathematician

William Henry Roever (16 May 1874, St. Louis – 31 January 1951, St. Louis) was an American mathematician.

Roever received in 1897 a bachelor's degree in mechanical engineering from McKelvey School of Engineering. He received an A.M. in 1904 and a Ph.D. in mathematics in 1906 from Harvard Faculty of Arts and Sciences with advisor Maxime Bôcher and thesis Brilliant points. Roever taught astronomy from 1899 to 1901 at Washington University in St. Louis and mathematics from 1905 to 1908 at Massachusetts Institute of Technology. He then returned to Washington University in St. Louis to teach mathematics and later became the chair of the department of mathematics.

He was an Invited Speaker of the ICM in 1924 in Toronto.

== Selected publications ==
- Roever, W. H. (1901). "Brilliant points and loci of brilliant points". The Annals of Mathematics. 3 (1/4): 113–128. doi:10.2307/1967637. JSTOR 1967637.
- Roever, William H. (1908). "Brilliant points of curves and surfaces". Trans. Amer. Math. Soc. 9 (3): 245–279. doi:10.1090/s0002-9947-1908-1500813-7. JSTOR 1988604.
- Roever, William H. (1911). "The southerly deviation of falling bodies". Trans. Amer. Math. Soc. 12 (3): 335–353. doi:10.1090/s0002-9947-1911-1500893-9. JSTOR 1988671.
- Roever, William H. (1912). "The southerly and easterly deviations of falling bodies for an unsymmetrical gravitational field of force". Trans. Amer. Math. Soc. 13 (4): 469–490. doi:10.1090/s0002-9947-1912-1500929-6. JSTOR 1988582.
- Roever, Wm. H. (1913). "The curve of light on a corrugated dome". The American Mathematical Monthly. 20 (10): 299–303. doi:10.1080/00029890.1913.11997986. JSTOR 2972527.
- Roever, Wm. H. (1915). "A geometric derivation of a general formula for the southerly deviation of freely falling bodies". Bull. Amer. Math. Soc. 21 (9): 444–462. doi:10.1090/S0002-9904-1915-02685-6.
- Roever, Wm. H. (1915). "Note on the meridional deviation of a falling body". Science. 42 (1073): 122–126. Bibcode:1915Sci....42..122R. doi:10.1126/science.42.1073.122. JSTOR 1638945. PMID 17742908.
- Roever, William H. (1918). "Descriptive geometry and its merits as a collegiate as well as an engineering subject". The American Mathematical Monthly. 25 (4): 145–159. doi:10.1080/00029890.1918.11998409. JSTOR 2973115.
- Roever, Wm. H. (1919). "Geometric explanation of a certain optical phenomenon". The American Mathematical Monthly. 26 (3): 111–112. doi:10.1080/00029890.1919.11998497. JSTOR 2972937.
- Roever, W. H. (1925). "Some phases of descriptive geometry". Bull. Amer. Math. Soc. 31 (9–10): 540–550. doi:10.1090/S0002-9904-1925-04107-5.
- Fundamental theorems of orthographic axonometry and their value in picturization. Washington University. Washington University studies. New series. Science and technology; no. 12. Washington University in St. Louis. 1941.
