= Grace–Walsh–Szegő theorem =

Mathematical theorem about polynomials

In mathematics, the Grace–Walsh–Szegő coincidence theorem is a result named after John Hilton Grace, Joseph L. Walsh, and Gábor Szegő.

== Statement ==
Suppose ƒ(z_{1}, ..., z_{n}) is a polynomial with complex coefficients, and that it is

- symmetric, i.e. invariant under permutations of the variables, and
- multi-affine, i.e. affine in each variable separately.

Let A be a circular region in the complex plane. If either A is convex or the degree of ƒ is n, then for every $\zeta_1,\ldots,\zeta_n\in A$ there exists $\zeta\in A$ such that

$$f(\zeta_1,\ldots,\zeta_n) = f(\zeta,\ldots,\zeta).$$
