= Blagovest Sendov =

Bulgarian mathematician and politician (1932–2020)

- Благовест Сендов
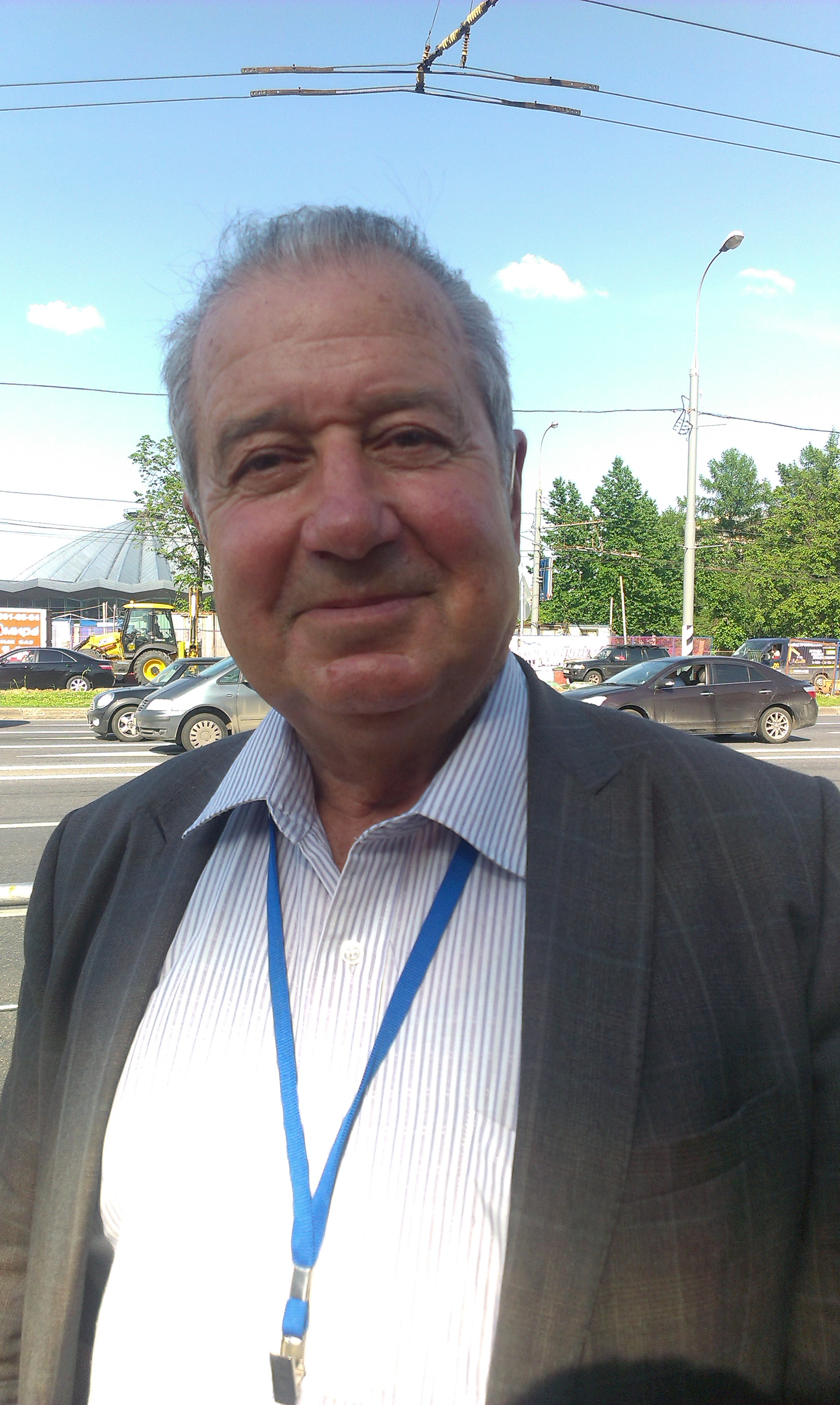
- Sendov in 2015

Bulgarian Ambassador to Japan
- In office 2004–2009

Deputy Chairperson of the National Assembly of Bulgaria
- In office 1997–2002

Chairperson of the National Assembly of Bulgaria
- In office 1995–1997
- Preceded by: Aleksandar Yordanov
- Succeeded by: Yordan Sokolov

Personal details
- Born: 8 February 1932 Asenovgrad, Bulgaria
- Died: 19 January 2020 (aged 87)
- Occupation: • Diplomat • Mathematician • Politician

Blagovest Hristov Sendov (Bulgarian: Благовест Сендов; 8 February 1932 – 19 January 2020) was a Bulgarian mathematician, diplomat and politician.

== Early life and education ==
Sendov was born in Asenovgrad, Bulgaria.

== Career ==
=== Academic ===
Sendov was the rector of Sofia University, located in Sofia, Bulgaria; and the Chairman of Bulgarian Academy of Sciences, also located in Sofia. He had more than 200 publications in fields related to mathematics and computer science.

=== Post-1989 political career ===
Sendov took part as an independent in the 1992 Bulgarian presidential election with Ognyan Saparev as his running mate, finishing in 4th place with 2.24% of the votes.

=== National Assembly of Bulgaria ===
From 1995 to 1997, he was the chairperson of the National Assembly of Bulgaria; and from 1997 to 2002, he was its deputy chairperson. His candidacy for that position was supported by the Bulgarian Socialist Party (BSP), the successor to the Bulgarian Communist Party (BCP). Although never a member of the BCP, Sendov had close ties to former Bulgarian communist dictator Todor Zhivkov.

The rightist Union of the Democratic Forces removed him temporarily from that duty in 2000 when Sendov cosigned, together with four members of the BSP, a letter to the Israeli president asking that portraits of the Bulgarian royal family (from the 1940s) be removed from a memorial in Israel. This memorial commemorates that all Bulgarian Jews were saved from deportation to concentration camps during World War II.

=== Bulgaria ambassador to Japan ===
Sendov was Bulgarian ambassador to Japan from 2004 to 2009.

=== Sendov's conjecture ===
Sendov's name is attached to one of the major problems in the study of polynomial zeros, Sendov's conjecture (sometimes incorrectly known as Ilieff's conjecture).

=== Serbian Academy of Sciences and Arts ===
In 2000 he was elected as a member of Serbian Academy of Sciences and Arts, an academic institution located in Belgrade, Serbia.
