= Charles Anthony Micchelli =

American mathematician

Charles Anthony Micchelli (born December 22, 1942) is an American mathematician, with an international reputation in numerical analysis, approximation theory, and machine learning.

== Biography ==
As the youngest of four children, he was born into an Italian-American family in Newark, New Jersey. After graduating from Newark's East Side High School, he attended Rutgers University–New Brunswick, where he graduated in 1964 with a bachelor's degree in mathematics. He then became a graduate student at Stanford University. After taking a course on Chebyshev polynomials taught by Gábor Szegő, he became interested in approximation theory. Micchelli graduated in 1969 with a PhD from Stanford University. His PhD thesis Saturation Classes and Iterates of Operators was supervised by Samuel Karlin.

Influenced by Gene Golub and recognizing the growing importance of computers and numerical analysis, Micchelli accepted a postgraduate invitation at the Uppsala University's computer sciences department. On his return to Stanford University he met IBM researcher Theodore J. Rivlin, who was visiting Karlin and Golub. Rivlin recruited Micchelli to become a researcher for the mathematical sciences department of the Thomas J. Watson Research Center. There Micchelli did research from 1970 to 2000 and was a visiting professor at more than twenty universities in various countries, including in Israel, Sweden, Italy, Germany, the United Kingdom, Belgium, Chile, the United States, Spain, Canada, and Singapore. In 2000 he retired as an emeritus of IBM and became a professor of mathematics at the University at Albany, SUNY. He retired in 2016.

Micchelli is the author or co-author of more than 275 research publications and is on the list of ISI's Highly Cited Researchers. He has made contributions to the theory of total positivity, multivariate splines, refinability, geometric modeling, wavelets, interpolation by radial functions, neural networks, and machine learning theory. In 1974 I. J. Schoenberg presented a new approach to Micchelli's theory of cardinal L-splines. In 1983 Micchelli was an invited speaker at the International Congress of Mathematicians in Warsaw.

Through his numerous research stays at universities, conferences, invitations and even family trips, Micchelli has traveled throughout the world many times, At a mathematical congress, at the Oberwolfach Research Institute for Mathematics, he began his relationship with the University of Zaragoza (UNIZAR) through a meeting with Professor Mariano Gasca from UNIZAR's department of applied mathematics. Micchelli was on sabbatical at UNIZAR for the academic year 1988–1989 and with Gasca was the co-director in 1989 of a NATO Advanced Study Institute on Computation of Curves and Surfaces in Puerto de la Cruz, Tenerife from July 10 to 21, 1989. Since then, especially in the 1990s, Micchelli has repeatedly visited and contributed academically to UNIZAR, which awarded him an honorary doctorate in 1994.

Starting an organizational effort in 1991, Micchelli was one the founding editors of the journal Advances in Computational Mathematics (with first issue in February 1993) and became the founding co-editor-in-chief with John Charles Mason (1941–2016). Micchelli has also served on the editorial boards of several other international journals.

In 1965 he married his wife Patricia, who was his schoolmate since childhood. They have two children. In 2006 Craig A. Micchelli joined the faculty of the department of developmental biology at Washington University School of Medicine in St. Louis.

== Selected publications ==
=== Articles ===
- Micchelli, C. A.; Rivlin, T. J. (1972). "Turán Formulae and Highest Precision Quadrature Rules for Chebyshev Coefficients". IBM Journal of Research and Development. 16 (4): 372–379. doi:10.1147/rd.164.0372.
- Micchelli, C. A.; Rivlin, T. J. (1973). "Numerical integration rules near Gaussian quadrature". Israel Journal of Mathematics. 16 (3): 287–299. doi:10.1007/BF02756708. S2CID 121533778.
- Micchelli, C. A. (1975). "Convergence of Positive Linear Operators on C(X)" (PDF). Journal of Approximation Theory. 13 (3): 305–315. doi:10.1016/0021-9045(75)90040-4.
- Micchelli, C. A.; Rivlin, T. J. (1977). "A Survey of Optimal Recovery". Optimal Estimation in Approximation Theory. pp. 1–54. doi:10.1007/978-1-4684-2388-4_1. ISBN 978-1-4684-2390-7.
- Micchelli, C. A.; Pinkus, Allan (1977). "Moment Theory for Weak Chebyshev Systems with Applications to Monosplines, Quadrature Formulae and Best One-Sided $L^1$-Approximation by Spline Functions with Fixed Knots". SIAM Journal on Mathematical Analysis. 8 (2): 206–230. doi:10.1137/0508015. ISSN 0036-1410.
- Micchelli, Charles A.; Sharma, A. (1980). "Spline Functions on the Circle: Cardinal L-Splines Revisited". Canadian Journal of Mathematics. 32 (6): 1459–1473. doi:10.4153/CJM-1980-115-9. S2CID 122375013.
- Johnson, Olin G.; Micchelli, Charles A.; Paul, George (1983). "Polynomial Preconditioners for Conjugate Gradient Calculations". SIAM Journal on Numerical Analysis. 20 (2): 362–376. Bibcode:1983SJNA...20..362J. doi:10.1137/0720025.
- Dahmen, Wolfgang; Micchelli, Charles A. (1983). "Translates of multivarlate splines". Linear Algebra and Its Applications. 52–53: 217–234. doi:10.1016/0024-3795(83)80015-9.
- Micchelli, C. A.; Rivlin, T. J. (1985). "Lectures on optimal recovery". Numerical Analysis Lancaster 1984. Lecture Notes in Mathematics. Vol. 1129. pp. 21–93. doi:10.1007/BFb0075157. ISBN 978-3-540-15234-7.
- Micchelli, C. A. (1986). "Interpolation of scattered data: distance matrices and conditionally positive definite functions" (PDF). Constructive Approximation. 2 (1): 11–22. doi:10.1007/BF01893414. (over 2160 citations)
- Micchelli, Charles A. (1986). "Interpolation of scattered data: Distance matrices and conditionally positive definite functions". Constructive Approximation. 2: 11–22. doi:10.1007/BF01893414. S2CID 189914732.
- Micchelli, Charles A.; Pinkus, Allan (1989). "Some Remarks on Nonnegative Polynomials on Polyhedra". Probability, Statistics, and Mathematics. pp. 163–186. doi:10.1016/B978-0-12-058470-3.50018-5. ISBN 978-0-12-058470-3.
- Mhaskar, H.N; Micchelli, Charles A. (1992). "Approximation by superposition of sigmoidal and radial basis functions". Advances in Applied Mathematics. 13 (3): 350–373. doi:10.1016/0196-8858(92)90016-P.
- Dahmen, Wolfgang; Micchelli, Charles A.; Seidel, Hans-Peter (1992). "Blossoming begets $B$-spline bases built better by $B$-patches". Mathematics of Computation. 59 (199): 97. Bibcode:1992MaCom..59...97D. doi:10.1090/S0025-5718-1992-1134724-1.
- Dahmen, Wolfgang; Micchelli, Charles A. (1993). "Using the Refinement Equation for Evaluating Integrals of Wavelets". SIAM Journal on Numerical Analysis. 30 (2): 507–537. doi:10.1137/0730024.
- Jia, Rong-Qing; Micchelli, Charles A. (1993). "On linear independence for integer translates of a finite number of functions". Proceedings of the Edinburgh Mathematical Society. 36: 69–85. doi:10.1017/S0013091500005903.
- Micchelli, Charles A.; Xu, Yuesheng (1994). "Using the Matrix Refinement Equation for the Construction of Wavelets on Invariant Sets". Applied and Computational Harmonic Analysis. 1 (4): 391–401. doi:10.1006/acha.1994.1024.
- Micchelli, C.A.; Sauer, Thomas (1997). "Regularity of multiwavelets". Advances in Computational Mathematics. 7 (4): 455–545. doi:10.1023/A:1018971524949. S2CID 18838600.
- Dahmen, W.; Micchelli, C. A. (1997). "Biorthogonal Wavelet Expansions". Constructive Approximation. 13 (3): 293–328. doi:10.1007/s003659900045. S2CID 15299124.
- Chen, Zhongying; Micchelli, Charles A.; Xu, Yuesheng (2002). "Fast Collocation Methods for Second Kind Integral Equations". SIAM Journal on Numerical Analysis. 40: 344–375. doi:10.1137/S0036142901389372.
- Micchelli, Charles A.; Pontil, Massimiliano (2005). "On Learning Vector-Valued Functions". Neural Computation. 17 (1): 177–204. doi:10.1162/0899766052530802. ISSN 0899-7667. PMID 15563752. S2CID 12725766. (over 520 citations)
- Evgeniou, T.; Micchelli, C. A.; Pontil, M. (2005). "Learning multiple tasks with kernel methods" (PDF). Journal of Machine Learning Research. 6 (4): 615–637. (over 980 citations)
- Micchelli, Charles A.; Pontil, Massimiliano (2005). "On Learning Vector-Valued Functions". Neural Computation. 17 (1): 177–204. doi:10.1162/0899766052530802. PMID 15563752. S2CID 12725766.
- Micchelli, Charles A.; Shen, Lixin; Xu, Yuesheng (2011). "Proximity algorithms for image models: Denoising". Inverse Problems. 27 (4) 045009. Bibcode:2011InvPr..27d5009M. doi:10.1088/0266-5611/27/4/045009. S2CID 119538701.
- Micchelli, Charles A.; Shen, Lixin; Xu, Yuesheng; Zeng, Xueying (2013). "Proximity algorithms for the L1/TV image denoising model". Advances in Computational Mathematics. 38 (2): 401–426. doi:10.1007/s10444-011-9243-y. S2CID 20378302.
- Li, Zheng; Micchelli, Charles A.; Xu, Yuesheng (2020). "Fixed-point proximity algorithm for minimal norm interpolation". Applied and Computational Harmonic Analysis. 49 (1): 328–342. doi:10.1016/j.acha.2019.12.002. ISSN 1063-5203. S2CID 213722840.

=== Books ===
- Cavaretta, Alfred S.; Dahmen, Wolfgang; Micchelli, Charles A. (1991). Stationary Subdivision. American Mathematical Soc. ISBN 978-0-8218-2507-5.
- Micchelli, Charles A. (January 1995). Mathematical Aspects of Geometric Modeling. ISBN 978-0-89871-331-2.
- Chen, Zhongying; Micchelli, Charles A.; Xu, Yuesheng (16 July 2015). Multiscale Methods for Fredholm Integral Equations. Cambridge University Press. ISBN 978-1-316-38130-4.

=== As editor ===
- Selected Papers of Alan Hoffman with Commentary. World Scientific. 2003. ISBN 978-981-279-693-6.
- Gasca, Mariano; Micchelli, Charles A., eds. (9 March 2013). Total Positivity and Its Applications. Springer Science & Business Media. ISBN 978-94-015-8674-0. (originally published in 1996 by Kluwer Academic Publishers)
