= John Hilton Grace =

British mathematician

- Born: 21 May 1873; Halewood, Lancashire
- Died: 4 March 1958 (aged 84)
- Known for: Grace–Walsh–Szegő theorem
- Awards: Fellow of the Royal Society
- Scientific career
- Fields: Mathematics

John Hilton Grace FRS (21 May 1873 – 4 March 1958) was a British mathematician. The Grace–Walsh–Szegő theorem is named in part after him.

== Early life ==
He was born in Halewood, near Liverpool, the eldest of the six children of farmer William Grace and Elizabeth Hilton. He was educated at the village school and the Liverpool Institute. From there in 1892 he went up to Peterhouse, Cambridge to study mathematics. His nephew, his younger sister's son, was the animal geneticist, Alan Robertson FRS.

== Career ==
He was made a Fellow of Peterhouse in 1897 and became a Lecturer of Mathematics at Peterhouse and Pembroke colleges. An example of his work was his 1902 paper on The Zeros of a Polynomial. In 1903 he collaborated with Alfred Young on their book Algebra of Invariants.

He was elected a Fellow of the Royal Society in 1908.

He spent 1916–1917 as visiting professor in Lahore and deputised for Professor MacDonald at Aberdeen University during the latter part of the war.

In 1922 a breakdown in health forced his retirement from academic life and he spent the next part of his life in Norfolk.

He died in Huntingdon in 1958 and was buried in the family grave at St. Nicholas Church, Halewood.

== Theorem on zeros of a polynomial ==
If

$$a(z)=a_0+\tbinom{n}{1}a_1 z+\tbinom{n}{2}a_2 z^2+\dots+a_n z^n$$,

$$b(z)=b_0+\tbinom{n}{1}b_1 z+\tbinom{n}{2}b_2 z^2+\dots+b_n z^n$$

are two polynomials that satisfy the apolarity condition, i.e. $a_0 b_n - \tbinom{n}{1}a_1 b_{n-1} + \tbinom{n}{2}a_2 b_{n-2} - \cdots +(-1)^n a_n b_0 = 0$, then every neighbourhood that includes all zeros of one polynomial also includes at least one zero of the other.

=== Corollary ===
Let $a(z)$ and $b(z)$ be defined as in the above theorem. If the zeros of both polynomials lie in the unit disk, then the zeros of the "composition" of the two, $c(z)=a_0 b_0 + \tbinom{n}{1}a_1 b_1 z + \tbinom{n}{2}a_2 b_2 z^2 + \cdots + a_n b_n z^n$, also lie in the unit disk.

== Publications ==
- Grace, J. H. (January 1936). "The actual irreducibility of some finite systems of invariant forms". Journal of the London Mathematical Society. s1-11 (1): 20–21. doi:10.1112/jlms/s1-11.1.20. JFM 62.0075.02. Zbl 0013.14601.
- Grace, J. H. (April 1930). "Two contract theorems". Journal of the London Mathematical Society. s1-5 (2): 121–124. doi:10.1112/jlms/s1-5.2.121.
- Grace, J. H. (January 1930). "The algebraic expression of projective properties". Journal of the London Mathematical Society. s1-5 (1): 62–67. doi:10.1112/jlms/s1-5.1.62.
- Grace, J. H. (1928). "Binary and ternary forms with prescribed polar systems". Proceedings of the London Mathematical Society. s2-28 (1): 421–430. doi:10.1112/plms/s2-28.1.421. JFM 54.0133.03.
- Grace, J. H. (January 1928). "Surfaces related to a rational normal curve". Journal of the London Mathematical Society. s1-3 (1): 34–38. doi:10.1112/jlms/s1-3.1.34.
- Grace, J. H. (July 1927). "Note on ternary forms". Journal of the London Mathematical Society. s1-2 (3): 182–185. doi:10.1112/jlms/s1-2.3.182.
- Grace, J. H. (January 1927). "The four square theorem". Journal of the London Mathematical Society. s1-2 (1): 3–8. doi:10.1112/jlms/s1-2.1.3.
- Grace, J. H. (July 1926). "A point in enumerative geometry". Journal of the London Mathematical Society. s1-1 (3): 167–170. doi:10.1112/jlms/s1-1.3.167.
- Grace, J. H. (1918). "Note on a Diophantine approximation". Proceedings of the London Mathematical Society. s2-17 (1): 316–319. doi:10.1112/plms/s2-17.1.316.
- Grace, J. H. (1918). "Tetrahedra in relation to spheres and quadrics". Proceedings of the London Mathematical Society. s2-17 (1): 259–271. doi:10.1112/plms/s2-17.1.259. JFM 47.0612.01.
- Grace, J. H. (1918). "The classification of rational approximations". Proceedings of the London Mathematical Society. s2-17 (1): 247–258. doi:10.1112/plms/s2-17.1.247. JFM 47.0166.01.
- Grace, J. H. (1 June 1917). "On Feuerbach's Theorem". The Journal of the Indian Mathematical Society. 9 (4): 94–99.
- Grace, J. H. (1904). "Note on the foregoing paper". Proceedings of the London Mathematical Society. s2-1 (1): 208–209. doi:10.1112/plms/s2-1.1.208.
- Grace, J. H. (1904). "Extension of two theorems on covariants". Proceedings of the London Mathematical Society. s2-1 (1): 151–153. doi:10.1112/plms/s2-1.1.151. JFM 34.0120.03.
- Grace, J. H.; A. Young (1903). The Algebra of Invariants. Cambridge University Press.
- Grace, J. H. (11 November 1901). "On the zeros of a polynomial". Mathematical Proceedings of the Cambridge Philosophical Society. 11: 352–357.
- Grace, J. H. (May 1902). "On perpetuants". Proceedings of the London Mathematical Society. s1-35 (1): 319–331. doi:10.1112/plms/s1-35.1.319.
- Grace, J. H. (May 1902). "Types of perpetuants". Proceedings of the London Mathematical Society. s1-35 (1): 107–114. doi:10.1112/plms/s1-35.1.107.
- Grace, J. H. (4 March 1901). "A theorem on curves in a linear complex". Mathematical Proceedings of the Cambridge Philosophical Society. 11: 132–133.
- Grace, J. H. (March 1901). "Linear null systems of binary forms". Proceedings of the London Mathematical Society. s1-34 (1): 168–172. doi:10.1112/plms/s1-34.1.168. JFM 33.0126.02.
- Grace, J. H. (November 1900). "On a class of plane curves". Proceedings of the London Mathematical Society. s1-33 (1): 193–196. doi:10.1112/plms/s1-33.1.193.
- Grace, J. H. (1898). "Circles, spheres, and linear complexes". Transactions of the Cambridge Philosophical Society. 16: 153–190.
