= Marden's theorem =

On zeros of derivatives of cubic polynomials

A triangle and its Steiner inellipse. The zeroes of p(z) are the black dots, and the zeroes of p'(z) are the red dots). The center green dot is the zero of p"(z). Marden's theorem states that the red dots are the foci of the ellipse.

In mathematics, Marden's theorem, named after Morris Marden but proved about 100 years earlier by Jörg Siebeck, gives a geometric relationship between the zeroes of a third-degree polynomial with complex coefficients and the zeroes of its derivative. See also geometrical properties of polynomial roots.

== Statement ==
A cubic polynomial has three zeroes in the complex number plane, which in general form a triangle, and the Gauss–Lucas theorem states that the roots of its derivative lie within this triangle. Marden's theorem states their location within this triangle more precisely:

Suppose the zeroes z_{1}, z_{2}, and z_{3} of a third-degree polynomial p(z) are non-collinear. There is a unique ellipse inscribed in the triangle with vertices z_{1}, z_{2}, z_{3} and tangent to the sides at their midpoints: the Steiner inellipse. The foci of that ellipse are the zeroes of the derivative p'(z).

== Proof ==
This proof comes from an exercise in Fritz Carlson's book “Geometri” (in Swedish, 1943).

Proof

Given any $a, b \in \mathbb C$ with $a \neq 0$, define $g(z) = f(az + b)$, then $g'(z) = af'(az+b)$. Thus, we have
$$g^{-1}(0) = (f^{-1}(0)-b)/a$$

and similarly for $g'$ and $f'$. In other words, by a linear change of variables, we may perform arbitrary translation, rotation, and scaling on the roots of $f$ and $f'$.

Thus, WLOG, we let the Steiner inellipse's focal points be on the real axis, at $\pm c$, where $c$ is the focal length. Let $a, b$ be the long and short semiaxis lengths, so that $c = \sqrt{a^2 - b^2}$.

Let the three roots of $f$ be $z_j := x_j + y_j i$ for $j= 0, 1, 2$.

Horizontally stretch the complex plane so that the Steiner inellipse becomes a circle of radius $b$. This would transform the triangle into an equilateral triangle, with vertices $\zeta_j = \frac{b}{a}x_j + y_j i$.

By geometry of the equilateral triangle, $\sum_j \zeta_j = 0$, we have $\sum_j z_j = 0$, thus $f(z) = z^3 + z\sum_j z_j z_{j+1} - z_0z_1z_2$ by Vieta's formulas (for notational cleanness, we "loop back" the indices, that is, $z_3 = z_0$.). Since $f'(z) = 3z^2+\sum_j z_j z_{j+1}$ and we want to show $f'(z) = 3\left(z^2-c^2\right)$, it remains to show that $\sum_j z_j z_{j+1} = -3c^2$.

Since $0 = \left(\sum_j z_j\right)^2 = \sum_j z_j^2 + 2 \sum_j z_jz_{j+1}$, it remains to show $\sum_j z_j^2 = 6c^2$, that is, it remains to show

$$\sum_j x_jy_j = 0; \quad \sum_j \left(x_j^2 - y_j^2\right) = 6(a^2 - b^2).$$

By the geometry of the equilateral triangle, we have $\sum_j \zeta_j^2 = 0$, and $|\zeta_j| = 2b$ for each $j$, which implies

$$\sum_j \frac{2b}{a} x_jy_j = 0; \quad \sum_j \left(\frac{b^2}{a^2} x_j^2 - y_j^2\right)= 0;  \quad \sum_j \left(\frac{b^2}{a^2} x_j^2 + y_j^2\right)= 12b^2$$

which yield the desired equalities.

== Additional relations between root locations and the Steiner inellipse ==
By the Gauss–Lucas theorem, the root of the double derivative p"(z) must be the average of the two foci, which is the center point of the ellipse and the centroid of the triangle. In the special case that the triangle is equilateral (as happens, for instance, for the polynomial p(z) = z^{3} − 1) the inscribed ellipse becomes a circle, and the derivative of p has a double root at the center of the circle. Conversely, if the derivative has a double root, then the triangle must be equilateral (Kalman 2008a).

== Generalizations ==
A more general version of the theorem, due to Linfield (1920), applies to polynomials p(z) = (z − a)^{i} (z − b)^{j} (z − c)^{k} whose degree i + j + k may be higher than three, but that have only three roots a, b, and c. For such polynomials, the roots of the derivative may be found at the multiple roots of the given polynomial (the roots whose exponent is greater than one) and at the foci of an ellipse whose points of tangency to the triangle divide its sides in the ratios i : j, j : k, and k : i.

Another generalization (Parish (2006)) is to n-gons: some n-gons have an interior ellipse that is tangent to each side at the side's midpoint. Marden's theorem still applies: the foci of this midpoint-tangent inellipse are zeroes of the derivative of the polynomial whose zeroes are the vertices of the n-gon.

== History ==
Jörg Siebeck discovered this theorem 81 years before Marden wrote about it. However, Dan Kalman titled his American Mathematical Monthly paper "Marden's theorem" because, as he writes, "I call this Marden’s Theorem because I first read it in M. Marden’s wonderful book".

Marden (1945, 1966) attributes what is now known as Marden's theorem to Siebeck (1864) and cites nine papers that included a version of the theorem. Dan Kalman won the 2009 Lester R. Ford Award of the Mathematical Association of America for his 2008 paper in the American Mathematical Monthly describing the theorem.

== See also ==
- Bôcher's theorem for rational functions
