= Morris Marden =

American mathematician (1905–1991)

- Born: 12 February 1905; East Boston, United States
- Died: 1991 (aged 85–86)
- Occupation: Mathematician

Morris Marden (1905–1991) was an American mathematician.

== Biography ==
He was born on 12 February 1905 in East Boston, United States. He was the seventh child of Abram and Fannie B. Marden.

He died in 1991.

== Education ==
He completed his PhD dissertation on the Location of the Roots of the Jacobian of Two Binary Forms and of the Derivative of a Rational Function under the supervision of Joseph L. Walsh.

== Career ==
He is known for the Marden's theorem, which was proven by Jörg Siebeck.

== Bibliography ==
His publications include:

- Geometry of Polynomials
- The geometry of the zeros of a polynomial in a complex variable
- Geometry of Polynomials. Second Edition. Mathematical Surveys Number 3
