= Advances in Computational Mathematics =

Scientific journal

- Discipline: Computational mathematics
- Language: English
- Edited by: Alexander Barnett

Publication details
- History: 1993—present
- Publisher: Springer
- Frequency: Bimonthly
- Impact factor: 2.6 (2025)

Standard abbreviations
- ISO 4: Adv. Comput. Math.

Indexing
- ISSN: 1019-7168 (print); 1572-9044 (web)

Links
- Journal homepage; Online access; Online archive

Advances in Computational Mathematics is a peer-reviewed scientific journal published bimonthly by Springer Science+Business Media. Established in 1993 by founding editors-in-chief Charles Anthony Micchelli and John C. Mason, it covers developments in computational mathematics, with a focus on approximation theory, computational geometry, numerical analysis and data analysis. Its current editor-in-chief is Alexander Barnett (Flatiron Institute).

== Abstracting and indexing ==
The journal is abstracted and indexed in:

- EBSCO databases
- MathSciNet
- ProQuest databases
- Science Citation Index Expanded
- Scopus
- zbMATH

According to the Journal Citation Reports, the journal has a 2025 impact factor of 2.6.
