= Hurwitz's theorem (complex analysis) =

Limit of roots of sequence of functions

In mathematics and in particular the field of complex analysis, Hurwitz's theorem is a theorem associating the zeroes of a sequence of holomorphic, compact locally uniformly convergent functions with that of their corresponding limit. The theorem is named after Adolf Hurwitz.

== Statement ==
Let {f_{k}} be a sequence of holomorphic functions on a connected open set G that converge uniformly on compact subsets of G to a holomorphic function f which is not constantly zero on G. If f has a zero of order m at z_{0} then for every small enough ρ > 0 and for sufficiently large k ∈ N (depending on ρ), f_{k} has precisely m zeroes in the disk defined by |z − z_{0}| < ρ, including multiplicity. Furthermore, these zeroes converge to z_{0} as k → ∞.

== Remarks ==
The theorem does not guarantee that the result will hold for arbitrary disks. Indeed, if one chooses a disk such that f has zeroes on its boundary, the theorem fails. An explicit example is to consider the unit disk D and the sequence defined by

$$f_n(z) = z-1+\frac 1 n, \qquad z \in \mathbb C$$

which converges uniformly to f(z) = z − 1. The function f(z) contains no zeroes in D; however, each f_{n} has exactly one zero in the disk corresponding to the real value 1 − (1/n).

== Applications ==
Hurwitz's theorem is used in the proof of the Riemann mapping theorem, and also has the following two corollaries as an immediate consequence:

- Let G be a connected, open set and {f_{n}} a sequence of holomorphic functions which converge uniformly on compact subsets of G to a holomorphic function f. If each f_{n} is nonzero everywhere in G, then f is either identically zero or also is nowhere zero.
- If {f_{n}} is a sequence of univalent functions on a connected open set G that converge uniformly on compact subsets of G to a holomorphic function f, then either f is univalent or constant.

== Proof ==
Let f be an analytic function on an open subset of the complex plane with a zero of order m at z_{0}, and suppose that {f_{n}} is a sequence of functions converging uniformly on compact subsets to f. Fix some ρ > 0 such that f(z) ≠ 0 in 0 < |z − z_{0}| ≤ ρ. Choose δ such that |f(z)| > δ for z on the circle |z − z_{0}| = ρ. Since f_{k}(z) converges uniformly on the disc we have chosen, we can find N such that |f_{k}(z)| ≥ δ/2 for every k ≥ N and every z on the circle, ensuring that the quotient f_{k}′(z)/f_{k}(z) is well defined for all z on the circle |z − z_{0}| = ρ. By Weierstrass's theorem we have $f_k' \to f'$ uniformly on the disc, and hence we have another uniform convergence:

$$\frac{f_k'(z)}{f_k(z)} \to \frac{f'(z)}{f(z)}.$$

Denoting the number of zeros of f_{k}(z) in the disk by N_{k}, we may apply the argument principle to find

$$m = \frac 1 {2\pi i}\int_{\vert z -z_0\vert = \rho} \frac{f'(z)}{f(z)} \,dz = \lim_{k\to\infty} \frac 1 {2\pi i} \int_{\vert z -z_0\vert = \rho} \frac{f'_k(z)}{f_k(z)} \, dz = \lim_{k\to\infty} N_k$$

In the above step, we were able to interchange the integral and the limit because of the uniform convergence of the integrand. We have shown that N_{k} → m as k → ∞. Since the N_{k} are integer valued, N_{k} must equal m for large enough k.

== See also ==
- Rouché's theorem
