= Pacific Journal of Mathematics =

- Discipline: Mathematics
- Language: English, French, German

Publication details
- History: 1951–present
- Publisher: Mathematical Sciences Publishers (US)
- Frequency: Monthly
- Impact factor: 0.817 (2020)

Standard abbreviations
- ISO 4: Pac. J. Math.
- MathSciNet: Pacific J. Math.

Indexing
- ISSN: 0030-8730 (print); 1945-5844 (web)
- LCCN: 2008214196
- OCLC no.: 1761678

Links
- Journal homepage

The Pacific Journal of Mathematics is a mathematics research journal supported by several universities and research institutes, and currently published on their behalf by Mathematical Sciences Publishers, a non-profit academic publishing organisation, and the University of California, Berkeley.

It was founded in 1951 by František Wolf and Edwin F. Beckenbach and has been published continuously since, with six two-issue volumes per year. Full-text PDF versions of all journal articles are available on-line via the journal's website with a subscription.

The journal is incorporated as a 501(c)(3) organization.

The 255-page proof of the odd order theorem, by Walter Feit and John Griggs Thompson, was published as the entirety of Volume 13, Issue 3 of the journal in 1963.
