= William Mann (mathematician) =

American mathematician

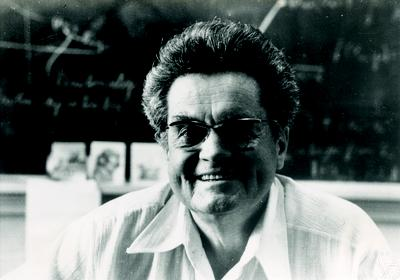
William Mann

William Robert Mann (September 21, 1920 – January 20, 2006) was a mathematician from Chapel Hill, North Carolina. Mann worked in mathematical analysis. He was the discoverer and eponym of the Mann iteration, a dynamical system in a continuous function. He was one of Frantisek Wolf's students.

== Publications ==
- William Robert Mann, Mean value methods in iteration, Proc. Amer. Math. Soc. 4, 1953, 506–510
- William Robert Mann and Angus Ellis Taylor, Advanced Calculus, 3rd Edition, John Wiley and Sons, 1983
