= Lester R. Ford =

American mathematician (1886–1967)

Lester Randolph Ford Sr.
- Born: October 25, 1886; Missouri, U.S.
- Died: November 11, 1967 (aged 81); Charlottesville, Virginia, U.S.
- Education: University of Missouri (BA); Harvard University (PhD)
- Known for: Ford circles
- Children: L. R. Ford Jr. Margaret Houston Ford
- Scientific career
- Fields: Mathematics
- Workplaces: Rice University, Mathematical Association of America
- Doctoral advisor: Maxime Bôcher
- Doctoral students: Edwin Beckenbach

This is about early- and mid-20th-century mathematician. For his mathematician son, active from the mid-20th century, see L. R. Ford Jr.

Lester Randolph Ford Sr. (October 25, 1886 – November 11, 1967) was an American mathematician, editor of the American Mathematical Monthly from 1942 to 1946, and president of the Mathematical Association of America from 1947 to 1948.

Ford circles are named after him. He is the father of L. R. Ford Jr.

== Education and career ==
Ford's first degree, Bachelor of Pedagogy, was from a normal school in Missouri. He then attended the University of Missouri in Columbia, graduating with a B.A. in 1911. For graduate work he went to Harvard University in 1912 and 13. Ford was then called to Scotland, where in 1914 he was instructor of mathematics at University of Edinburgh. Games of chess on campus gave Ford some social contact and reputation. In 1915 Ford published An Introduction to the Theory of Automorphic Functions as Edinburgh Mathematical Tract # 6.

Returning to Harvard in 1917, Ford was awarded his Ph.D. for the thesis Rational Approximations to an Irrational Complex Number, under the supervision of Maxime Bôcher.

Later Ford joined the faculty of Rice Institute in Houston, Texas. There he married Marguerite Eleanor John on 15 June 1924.

Moving north to Chicago, Ford taught at Armour Institute, soon to become Illinois Institute of Technology. From there he went to the editorship of The American Mathematical Monthly during World War II. Ford was president of the Mathematical Association of America from 1947 to 1948.

In 1964, the MAA recognised his contribution to mathematics by establishing the Lester R. Ford Awards for authors of articles of expository excellence published in The American Mathematical Monthly or Mathematics Magazine. (The prize is now known as the Paul R. Halmos – Lester R. Ford Award.) His doctoral students include Edwin Beckenbach.

== Publications ==
- 1915: An Introduction to the Theory of Automorphic Functions via Internet Archive
- 1919: Elementary Mathematics for Field Artillery
- 1929: Automorphic functions, New York, McGraw-Hill, 2004, ISBN 978-0-8218-3741-2, JFM 55.0810.04
- 1928: Introduction to Differential Equations via HathiTrust
- 1933: Differential Equations, second edition 1955,
- 1963: (with his son) Calculus, McGraw-Hill via HathiTrust
