= Theodore J. Rivlin =

American mathematician

Theodore Joseph Rivlin (11 September 1926, Brooklyn – 22 July 2006, Croton-on-Hudson) was an American mathematician, specializing in approximation theory. He is known for his 1969 book An Introduction to the Approximation of Functions (Dover reprint, 1981), which became a standard text.

== Education and career ==
Rivlin received in 1948 his bachelor's degree from Brooklyn College. After serving in the United States Army Air Force for eighteen months, he became a graduate student in mathematics at Harvard University, where he received in 1953 his Ph.D. with thesis advisor Joseph L. Walsh and thesis Overconvergent Taylor series and the zeroes of related polynomials. Rivlin from 1952 to 1955 taught mathematics at Johns Hopkins University and from 1955 to 1956 was a research associate at the Institute for Mathematics Sciences at New York University (later renamed the Courant Institute of Mathematical Sciences). He was from 1956 to 1959 a senior mathematical analyst at the Fairchild Engine and Airplane Corporation in Deer Park on Long Island; there he began intensive study of approximation theory and Chebyshev polynomials in connection with his work on developing thermodynamic tables. From 1959 until his retirement nearly 35 years later, Rivlin was a research staff member at IBM's Thomas J. Watson Research Center in Yorktown Heights, New York. He was on sabbatical from 1969 to 1970 at Stanford University's Computer Science Department and from 1976 to 1977 at Imperial College London's Mathematics Department.

From 1966 to 1976 Rivlin was an adjunct professor of mathematics at the Graduate Center of the City University of New York, where he lectured on approximation theory. For many years he was an associate editor for the Journal of Approximation Theory and wrote over 80 research articles on approximation theory and computational mathematics. The Annals of Numerical Analysis published in 1997 a special issue entitled The Heritage of P.L. Chebyshev: A Festschrift in honor of the 70th birthday of T.J. Rivlin.

== Selected publications ==
=== Articles ===
- with Nesmith C. Ankeny: "On a theorem of S. Bernstein" (PDF). Pacific Journal of Mathematics. 5 Suppl. (6): 849–852. 1955.
- with Harold S. Shapiro: Rivlin, T. J.; Shapiro, H. S. (1961). "A unified approach to certain problems of approximation and minimization". Journal of the Society for Industrial and Applied Mathematics. 9 (4): 670–699. doi:10.1137/0109056.
- with Richard Kelisky: Kelisky, Richard; Rivlin, Theodore (1967). "Iterates of Bernstein polynomials". Pacific Journal of Mathematics. 21 (3): 511–520. doi:10.2140/pjm.1967.21.511.
- with Charles A. Micchelli and Shmuel Winograd: Micchelli, C. A.; Rivlin, T. J.; Winograd, S. (1976). "The optimal recovery of smooth functions". Numerische Mathematik. 26 (1): 191–200. doi:10.1007/BF01395972. S2CID 121767854.
- with C. A. Micchelli: Micchelli, C. A.; Rivlin, T. J. (1977). "A survey of optimal recovery". In: Optimal estimation in approximation theory. The IBM Research Symposia Series. Springer. pp. 1–54. doi:10.1007/978-1-4684-2388-4_1. ISBN 978-1-4684-2390-7.
- with C. A. Micchelli: Micchelli, C. A.; Rivlin, T. J. (1985). "Lectures on optimal recovery". In: Numerical Analysis Lancaster 1984. Lecture Notes in Mathematics, vol. 1129. Vol. 1129. Springer. pp. 21–93. doi:10.1007/BFb0075157. ISBN 978-3-540-15234-7.

=== Books ===
- An Introduction to the Approximation of Functions. Waltham, Massachusetts: Blaisdell. 1969.; Rivlin, Theodore J. (January 2003). 2003 Dover republication of the 1981 Dover reprint. Dover Publications. ISBN 9780486495545.
- The Chebyshev Polynomials. NY: Wiley. 1974; 186 pages
  - Chebyshev Polynomials: From Approximation Theory to Algebra and Number Theory. NY: Wiley. 1990; 249 pages, revised 2nd edition of The Chebyshev Polynomials; addition of about 80 exercises, a chapter introducing some elementary algebraic and number theoretic properties of the Chebyshev polynomials, and additional coverage of the polynomials' extremal and iterative properties
