= Argument principle =

Theorem in complex analysis

The simple contour C (black), the zeros of f (blue) and the poles of f (red). Here we have $\frac{1}{2\pi i}\oint_{C} {f'(z) \over f(z)}\, dz=4-5.\,$

In complex analysis, the argument principle (or Cauchy's argument principle) is a theorem relating the difference between the number of zeros and poles of a meromorphic function to a contour integral of the function's logarithmic derivative.

== Formulation ==
If f is a meromorphic function inside and on some closed contour C, and f has no zeros or poles on C, then

$$\frac{1}{2\pi i}\oint_{C} {f'(z) \over f(z)}\, dz=Z-P$$

where Z and P denote respectively the number of zeros and poles of f inside the contour C, with each zero and pole counted as many times as its multiplicity and order, respectively, indicate. This statement of the theorem assumes that the contour C is simple, that is, without self-intersections, and that it is oriented counter-clockwise.

More generally, suppose that f is a meromorphic function on an open set Ω in the complex plane and that C is a closed curve in Ω which avoids all zeros and poles of f and is contractible to a point inside Ω. For each point z ∈ Ω, let n(C,z) be the winding number of C around z. Then

$$\frac{1}{2\pi i}\oint_{C} \frac{f'(z)}{f(z)}\, dz = \sum_a n(C,a) - \sum_b n(C,b)\,$$

where the first summation is over all zeros a of f counted with their multiplicities, and the second summation is over the poles b of f counted with their orders.

== Interpretation of the contour integral ==
The contour integral $\oint_{C} \frac{f'(z)}{f(z)}\, dz$ can be interpreted as 2πi times the winding number of the path f(C) around the origin, using the substitution w = f(z):

$$\oint_{C} \frac{f'(z)}{f(z)}\, dz = \oint_{f(C)} \frac{1}{w}\, dw$$

That is, it is i times the total change in the argument of f(z) as z travels around C, explaining the name of the theorem; this follows from

$$\frac{d}{dz}\log(f(z))=\frac{f'(z)}{f(z)}$$

and the relation between arguments and logarithms.

== Proof of the argument principle ==
Let z_{Z} be a zero of f. We can write f(z) = (z − z_{Z})^{k}g(z) where k is the multiplicity of the zero, and thus g(z_{Z}) ≠ 0. We get

$$f'(z)=k(z-z_Z)^{k-1}g(z)+(z-z_Z)^kg'(z)\,\!$$

and

$${f'(z)\over f(z)}={k \over z-z_Z}+{g'(z)\over g(z)}.$$

Since g(z_{Z}) ≠ 0, it follows that g' (z)/g(z) has no singularities at z_{Z}, and thus is analytic at z_{Z}, which implies that the residue of f′(z)/f(z) at z_{Z} is k.

Let z_{P} be a pole of f. We can write f(z) = (z − z_{P})^{−m}h(z) where m is the order of the pole, and h(z_{P}) ≠ 0. Then,

$$f'(z)=-m(z-z_P)^{-m-1}h(z)+(z-z_P)^{-m}h'(z)\,\!.$$

and

$${f'(z)\over f(z)}={-m \over z-z_P}+{h'(z)\over h(z)}$$

similarly as above. It follows that h′(z)/h(z) has no singularities at z_{P} since h(z_{P}) ≠ 0 and thus it is analytic at z_{P}. We find that the residue of f′(z)/f(z) at z_{P} is −m.

Putting these together, each zero z_{Z} of multiplicity k of f creates a simple pole for f′(z)/f(z) with the residue being k, and each pole z_{P} of order m of f creates a simple pole for f′(z)/f(z) with the residue being −m. (Here, by a simple pole we mean a pole of order one.) In addition, it can be shown that f′(z)/f(z) has no other poles, and so no other residues.

By the residue theorem we have that the integral about C is the product of 2πi and the sum of the residues. Together, the sum of the k's for each zero z_{Z} is the number of zeros counting multiplicities of the zeros, and likewise for the poles, and so we have our result.

== Generalized argument principle ==
There is an immediate generalization of the argument principle. Under the same hypotheses, suppose that g is analytic in the region $\Omega$. Then

$$\frac{1}{2\pi i}\oint_{C} {f'(z) \over f(z)} g(z) \, dz = \sum_a g(a) n(C,a) - \sum_b g(b) n(C,b)\,$$

where the first summation is again over all zeros a of f counted with their multiplicities, and the second summation is again over the poles b of f counted with their orders.

== Applications and consequences ==
The argument principle can be used to efficiently locate zeros or poles of meromorphic functions on a computer. Even with rounding errors, the expression ${1\over 2\pi i}\oint_{C} {f'(z) \over f(z)}\, dz$ will yield results close to an integer; by determining these integers for different contours C one can obtain information about the location of the zeros and poles. Numerical tests of the Riemann hypothesis use this technique to get an upper bound for the number of zeros of Riemann's $\xi(s)$ function inside a rectangle intersecting the critical line. The argument principle can also be used to prove Rouché's theorem, which can be used to bound the roots of polynomials.

As a consequence of the generalized argument princple, if f is a polynomial having zeros z_{1}, ..., z_{p} inside a simple contour C, and g(z) = z^{k}, then

$$\frac{1}{2\pi i} \oint_C z^k\frac{f'(z)}{f(z)}\, dz = z_1^k+z_2^k+\cdots+z_p^k,$$

is power sum symmetric polynomial of the roots of f.

Another consequence is if we compute the complex integral:

$$\oint_C f(z){g'(z) \over g(z)}\, dz$$

for an appropriate choice of g and f we have the Abel–Plana formula:

$$\sum_{n=0}^{\infty}f(n)-\int_{0}^{\infty}f(x)\,dx= f(0)/2+i\int_{0}^{\infty}\frac{f(it)-f(-it)}{e^{2\pi t}-1}\, dt\,$$

which expresses the relationship between a discrete sum and its integral.

The argument principle is also applied in control theory. In modern books on feedback control theory, it is commonly used as the theoretical foundation for the Nyquist stability criterion. Moreover, a more generalized form of the argument principle can be employed to derive Bode's sensitivity integral and other related integral relationships.

== History ==
According to the book by Frank Smithies (Cauchy and the Creation of Complex Function Theory, Cambridge University Press, 1997, p. 177), Augustin-Louis Cauchy presented a theorem similar to the above on 27 November 1831, during his self-imposed exile in Turin (then capital of the Kingdom of Piedmont-Sardinia) away from France. However, according to this book, only zeroes were mentioned, not poles. This theorem by Cauchy was only published many years later in 1874 in a hand-written form and so is quite difficult to read. Cauchy published a paper with a discussion on both zeroes and poles in 1855, two years before his death.

== See also ==
- Logarithmic derivative
- Nyquist stability criterion
