= František Wolf =

Czech mathematician (1904–1989)

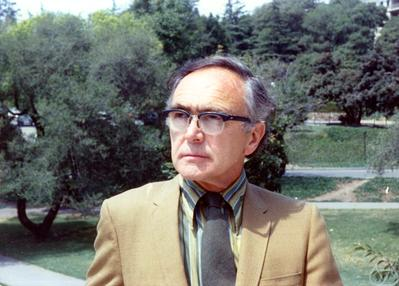
- František Wolf
- Born: 1904; Prostějov, Moravia
- Died: 1989 (aged 84–85); Berkeley, California
- Education: Masaryk University
- Scientific career
- Fields: Mathematics
- Workplaces: University of California, Berkeley
- Doctoral advisor: Otakar Borůvka
- Doctoral students: Theodore Gamelin; William Mann

František Wolf (1904–1989) was a Czech mathematician known for his contributions to trigonometry and mathematical analysis, specifically the study of the perturbation of linear operators.

Wolf was born 1904 in Prostějov, then part of the Austro-Hungarian empire and now part of the Czech Republic, the elder of two children of a furniture maker. He studied physics at Charles University in Prague, and then mathematics at Masaryk University in Brno under the supervision of Otakar Borůvka; he was awarded a doctorate in 1928 (degree Rerum Naturum Doctor). He then taught mathematics at the high school level until 1937, when he obtained a faculty position at Charles University. When the German army invaded Czechoslovakia in 1938, Wolf obtained an invitation to visit the Mittag-Leffler Institute in Sweden; he remained in Sweden as part of the underground resistance to the Germans until 1941 before emigrating to the United States. He taught at Macalester College for a year, and then joined the faculty of the University of California, Berkeley in 1942. At Berkeley, he was one of the co-founders of the Pacific Journal of Mathematics in 1951. He retired in 1972, but then moved to Guatemala where he helped to set up a graduate program in mathematics at the Universidad del Valle de Guatemala. He died on August 12, 1989, in Berkeley.

== Publications ==
- Wolf, František (1952), "Analytic perturbation of operators in Banach spaces", Mathematische Annalen, 124 (1): 317–333, doi:10.1007/bf01343573, S2CID 115814611
