= Sendov's conjecture =

Conjecture about the roots of polynomials

In mathematics, Sendov's theorem (formally a conjecture), sometimes also called Ilieff's conjecture, concerns the relationship between the locations of roots and critical points of a polynomial function of a complex variable. It is named after Blagovest Sendov.

The conjecture states that for a polynomial

$$f(z) = (z - r_1)\cdots (z-r_n),\quad n\ge 2,$$

with all roots r_{1}, ..., r_{n} inside the closed unit disk, each of the n roots is at a distance no more than 1 from at least one critical point.

The Gauss–Lucas theorem says that all of the critical points lie within the convex hull of the roots. It follows that the critical points must be within the unit disk, since the roots are.

The conjecture was previously proven for n < 9 by Brown and Xiang and for n sufficiently large by Tao.

There is also a generalisation by Dean Phelps and Rene S. Rodriguez: Zbl 0244.30001

On 5 August 2026, a proof of Sendov's conjecture generated using OpenAI's GPT-5.6 Pro was posted by Lech Mazur. Terence Tao subsequently published an exposition verifying and simplifying the argument, and extended the method to resolve the Phelps–Rodriguez conjecture.

== History ==
The conjecture was first proposed by Blagovest Sendov in 1959; he described the conjecture to his colleague Nikola Obreshkov. In 1967 the conjecture was misattributed to Ljubomir Iliev by Walter Hayman. In 1969 Meir and Sharma proved the conjecture for polynomials with n < 6. In 1991 Brown proved the conjecture for n < 7. Borcea extended the proof to n < 8 in 1996. Brown and Xiang proved the conjecture for n < 9 in 1999. In 2020, Terence Tao proved the conjecture in the special case of polynomials with sufficiently high degree.
