= Multiplicity (mathematics) =

Number of times an object must be counted for making true a general formula

In mathematics, the multiplicity of a member of a multiset is the number of times it appears in the multiset. For example, the number of times a given polynomial has a root at a given point is the multiplicity of that root.

The notion of multiplicity is important to be able to count correctly without specifying exceptions (for example, double roots counted twice). Hence the expression, "counted with multiplicity".

If multiplicity is ignored, this may be emphasized by counting the number of distinct elements, as in "the number of distinct roots". However, whenever a set (as opposed to multiset) is formed, multiplicity is automatically ignored, without requiring use of the term "distinct".

== Multiplicity of a prime factor ==
In prime factorization, the multiplicity of a prime factor is its $p$-adic valuation. For example, the prime factorization of the integer 60 is

60 = 2 × 2 × 3 × 5,

the multiplicity of the prime factor 2 is 2, while the multiplicity of each of the prime factors 3 and 5 is 1. Thus, 60 has four prime factors allowing for multiplicities, but only three distinct prime factors.

== Multiplicity of a root of a polynomial ==
Let $F$ be a field and $p(x)$ be a polynomial in one variable with coefficients in $F$. An element $a \in F$ is a root of multiplicity $k$ of $p(x)$ if there is a polynomial $s(x)$ such that $s(a)\neq 0$ and $p(x) = (x-a)^k s(x)$. If $k=1$, then a is called a simple root. If $k \geq 2$, then $a$ is called a multiple root.

For example, the polynomial $p(x) = x^3 + 2x^2 - 7x + 4$ has 1 and −4 as roots and can be written as $p(x) = (x+4)(x-1)^2$, which means that 1 is a root of multiplicity 2, and −4 is a simple root (of multiplicity 1). The multiplicity of a root is the number of occurrences of this root in the complete factorization of the polynomial, by means of the fundamental theorem of algebra.

If $a$ is a root of multiplicity $k$ of a polynomial, then it is a root of multiplicity $k-1$ of the derivative of that polynomial, unless the characteristic of the underlying field is a divisor of k, in which case $a$ is a root of multiplicity at least $k$ of the derivative.

The discriminant of a polynomial is zero if and only if the polynomial has a multiple root.

=== Behavior of a polynomial function near a multiple root ===
Graph of x^{3} + 2x^{2} − 7x + 4 with a simple root (multiplicity 1) at x=−4 and a root of multiplicity 2 at x=1. The graph crosses the x axis at the simple root. It is tangent to the x axis at the multiple root and does not cross it, since the multiplicity is even.

The graph of a polynomial function f intersects the x-axis at the real roots of the polynomial. The graph is tangent to this axis at the multiple roots of f and not tangent at the simple roots. The graph traverses the x-axis at roots of odd multiplicity and does not traverse it at roots of even multiplicity, where "to traverse the x-axis" means that, near the root, there are points of the graph on both sides of the axis.

A non-zero polynomial function is everywhere non-negative if and only if all its roots have even multiplicity and there exists an $x_0$ such that $f(x_0) > 0$.

== Multiplicity of a solution of a nonlinear system of equations ==
For an equation $f(x)=0$ with a single variable solution $x_*$, the multiplicity is $k$ if

$f(x_*)=f'(x_*) = \cdots = f^{(k-1)}(x_*)=0$ and $f^{(k)}(x_*)\neq0.$

In other words, the differential functional $\partial_j$, defined as the derivative $\frac{1}{j!}\frac{d^j}{dx^j}$ of a function at $x_*$, vanishes at $f$ for $j$ up to $k-1$. Those differential functionals $\partial_0, \partial_1,\cdots,\partial_{k-1}$ span a vector space, called the Macaulay dual space at $x_*$, and its dimension is the multiplicity of $x_*$ as a zero of $f$.

Let $\mathbf{f}(\mathbf{x})=\mathbf{0}$ be a system of $m$ equations of $n$ variables with a solution $\mathbf{x}_*$ where $\mathbf{f}$ is a mapping from $R^n$ to $R^m$ or from $C^n$ to $C^m$. There is also a Macaulay dual space of differential functionals at $\mathbf{x}_*$ in which every functional vanishes at $\mathbf{f}$. The dimension of this Macaulay dual space is the multiplicity of the solution $\mathbf{x}_*$ to the equation $\mathbf{f}(\mathbf{x})=\mathbf{0}$. The Macaulay dual space forms the multiplicity structure of the system at the solution.

For example, the solution $\mathbf{x}_*=(0,0)$ of the system of equations in the form of $\mathbf{f}(\mathbf{x})=\mathbf{0}$ with

$$\mathbf{f}(\mathbf{x})=\left[\begin{array}{c} \sin(x_1)-x_2+x_1^2 \\ x_1-\sin(x_2)+x_2^2 \end{array}\right]$$

is of multiplicity 3 because the Macaulay dual space

$$\operatorname{span} \{\partial_{00}, \partial_{10}+\partial_{01}, -\partial_{10}+\partial_{20}+\partial_{11}+\partial_{02}\}$$

is of dimension 3, where $\partial_{ij}$ denotes the differential functional $\frac{1}{i!j!}\frac{\partial^{i+j}}{\partial x_1^i \, \partial x_2^j}$ applied on a function at the point $\mathbf{x}_*=(0,0)$.

The multiplicity is always finite if the solution is isolated, is perturbation invariant in the sense that a $k$-fold solution becomes a cluster of solutions with a combined multiplicity $k$ under perturbation in complex spaces, and is identical to the intersection multiplicity on polynomial systems.

== Intersection multiplicity ==
In algebraic geometry, the intersection of two sub-varieties of an algebraic variety is a finite union of irreducible varieties. To each component of such an intersection is attached an intersection multiplicity. This notion is local in the sense that it may be defined by looking at what occurs in a neighborhood of any generic point of this component. It follows that without loss of generality, we may consider, in order to define the intersection multiplicity, the intersection of two affines varieties (sub-varieties of an affine space).

Thus, given two affine varieties V_{1} and V_{2}, consider an irreducible component W of the intersection of V_{1} and V_{2}. Let d be the dimension of W, and P be any generic point of W. The intersection of W with d hyperplanes in general position passing through P has an irreducible component that is reduced to the single point P. Therefore, the local ring at this component of the coordinate ring of the intersection has only one prime ideal, and is therefore an Artinian ring. This ring is thus a finite dimensional vector space over the ground field. Its dimension is the intersection multiplicity of V_{1} and V_{2} at W.

This definition allows us to state Bézout's theorem and its generalizations precisely.

This definition generalizes the multiplicity of a root of a polynomial in the following way. The roots of a polynomial f are points on the affine line, which are the components of the algebraic set defined by the polynomial. The coordinate ring of this affine set is $R=K[X]/\langle f\rangle,$ where K is an algebraically closed field containing the coefficients of f. If $f(X)=\prod_{i=1}^k (X-\alpha_i)^{m_i}$ is the factorization of f, then the local ring of R at the prime ideal $\langle X-\alpha_i\rangle$ is $K[X]/\langle (X-\alpha)^{m_i}\rangle.$ This is a vector space over K, which has the multiplicity $m_i$ of the root as a dimension.

This definition of intersection multiplicity, which is essentially due to Jean-Pierre Serre in his book Local Algebra, works only for the set theoretic components (also called isolated components) of the intersection, not for the embedded components. Theories have been developed for handling the embedded case (see Intersection theory for details).

== In complex analysis ==
Let z_{0} be a root of a holomorphic function f, and let n be the least positive integer such that the n^{th} derivative of f evaluated at z_{0} differs from zero. Then the power series of f about z_{0} begins with the n^{th} term, and f is said to have a root of multiplicity (or "order") n. If n = 1, the root is called a simple root.

We can also define the multiplicity of the zeroes and poles of a meromorphic function. If we have a meromorphic function $f = \frac{g}{h},$ take the Taylor expansions of g and h about a point z_{0}, and find the first non-zero term in each (denote the order of the terms m and n respectively) then if m = n, then the point has non-zero value. If $m>n,$ then the point is a zero of multiplicity $m-n.$ If $m<n$, then the point has a pole of multiplicity $n-m.$ The argument principle counts zeroes and poles according to their multiplicity.

== See also ==
- Algebraic multiplicity
