= PKS 2134+004 =

Quasar in the constellation Aquarius

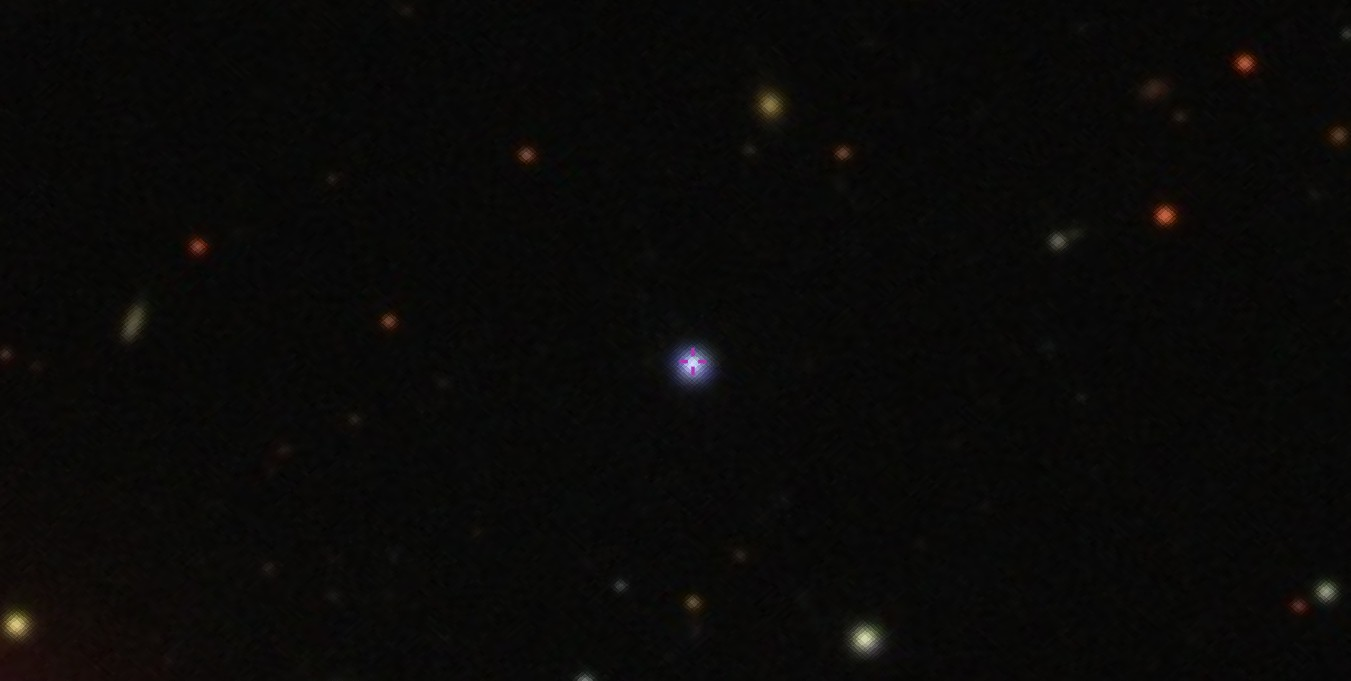
- The quasar PKS 2134+004.

Observation data (J2000.0 epoch)
- Constellation: Aquarius
- Right ascension: 21^{h} 36^{m} 38.5863^{s}
- Declination: +00° 41′ 54.213″
- Redshift: 1.941251
- Heliocentric radial velocity: 581,972 km/s
- Distance: 9.945 Gly
- Apparent magnitude (V): 17.08
- Apparent magnitude (B): 17.30

Characteristics
- Type: Opt. var, LPQ, FSRQ

Other designations
- PHL 61, OHIO X 057, LEDA 2830964, PKS 2134+008, QSO J2136+0041, DA 553, VSOP J2136+0041

PKS 2134+004 is a distant radio-loud quasar located in the constellation of Aquarius with an approximate magnitude of 18. Its redshift is (z) 1.944 and it is classified as a compact source. It was discovered in a survey by A.J. Shimmins in 1968. This object contains a radio spectrum appearing as flat, making it a flat-spectrum radio quasar. The spectrum of the source shows an absorption feature.

== Description ==
PKS 2134+004 is described as a high frequency peaker (HFP) with a core-jet morphology. It consists of a radio core located in the easternmost region and a jet that is pointing north with a bending angle towards the west, when imaged by the Very Long Baseline Array (VLBA). Based on polarimetric observations by VLBA, the core is found brighter and stronger at 15 GHz with a flat spectral index approximately measured as 0.0 ± 0.1. The core also has a polarization level of 0.5% and a Faraday rotation of 1100 rad m^{−2}.

Very Long Baseline Interferometry (VLBI) showed PKS 2134+004 has three components; mainly a compact strong core and two other components having an approximate separation of both 4.0 milliarcseconds at position angle of -152° and 2.5 milliarcseconds at position angle of -122°. Radio emission can be seen surrounding the core on arcsecond scales with a faint bridge reaching the western component.

PKS 2134+004 displays small variations, usually occurring on time-scales of several years. The radio spectrum of the source is peaked, with its flux density reaching around 8 Jy at 5 GHz frequencies. Light curves of the object showed it be to extremely variable at optical wavelengths and on a millimetre radio light curve, exhibiting two bright radio outbursts that were detected in 1937 and 1949, with its B magnitude reaching a maximum of 14.8. Increased gamma ray activity was detected by the Large Area Telescope (LAT) in December 2018.

The host of PKS 2134+004 is a massive, luminous elliptical galaxy. Based on studies, it has a color index that is found redder by 0.5 magnitude compared to its nucleus.
