= GB 1508+5714 =

Blazar in the constellation Draco

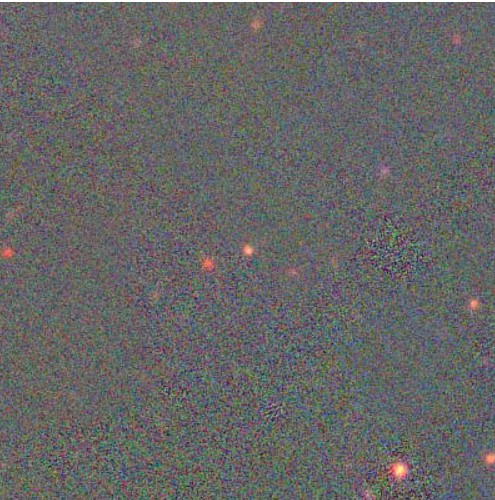

Observation data (J2000.0 epoch)
- Constellation: Draco
- Right ascension: 15^{h} 10^{m} 02.9224^{s}
- Declination: +57° 02′ 43.376″
- Redshift: 4.313733
- Heliocentric radial velocity: 1,293,225 km/s
- Distance: 11.898 Gly
- Apparent magnitude (V): 21.38
- Apparent magnitude (B): 22.73

Characteristics
- Type: FSRQ
- Notable features: Radio-selected quasar, blazar

Other designations
- QSO B1508+572, INTREF 636, GB6 B1508+5714, TXS 1508+572, SDSS J151002.93+570243.6

GB 1508+5714 is an extremely distant blazar located in the constellation of Draco. It has a redshift of (z) 4.30 and is classified as a radio-loud quasar, first discovered in 1995 by astronomers. The radio spectrum of the source appears as flat, making it a flat-spectrum source but also a bright X-ray source.

== Description ==
GB 1508+5714 is variable on the electromagnetic spectrum. It is known to emit a powerful gamma-ray flare in February 2022, detected by the Fermi Gamma-ray Space Telescope, between the 0.1-300 GeV range but its flux is 25 times more brighter. In additional, GB 1508+5714 also displayed optical flares that was shown on both r and i bands when shown by light curves taken from Zwicky Transient Facility. Prolonged gamma activity was detected as well, showing variable flux on timescales.

Radio imaging by Low-Frequency Array (LOFAR) on arcsecond scales, shows the source of GB 1508+5714 is mainly made up of a compact radio core with a flat spectral index of 0.02 ± 0.01 and two emission regions located both west and east directions of the core. Very long baseline interferometry (VLBI), shows the source to be a core-jet structure instead with the core located northeast and a jet component located in southwest direction, with the southernmost faint feature being identified as a radio lobe.

An X-ray jet was discovered by Chandra X-ray Observatory in 2003 with flux and luminosity values measured as 9.2 × 10^{−15} erg cm^{−2} s^{−1} and 1.6 × 10^{45} erg s^{−1} respectively. Based on observations, the size of the jet is found to have a projected distance of 25 kiloparsecs with the X-ray emission peaking by 2 arcseconds as it reaches southwest from the core. This emission is possibly caused due to relativistic jet particles and cosmic microwave background photons interacting with each other.
