= IOV =

Iov or IOV may refer to:

- Independent Order of Vikings, an American organization that promotes Swedish culture and language
- Internet of vehicles, a network of connected transport devices and their monitoring systems
- In-Orbit Validation satellites, testbed satellites followed by four IOV Galileo satellites
- Interval of Validity, the range of values for x and y under which a differential equation is valid (see also Method of averaging and Integrating factor)
- Patriarch Job of Moscow (Russian: Иов, romanized: Iov; 16th century – 1607), first Patriarch of Moscow and All Russia
- Istituto Oncologico Veneto (Venetian Oncology Institute), the public clinical research centre and hospital specialised on oncology in Veneto, Italy.
