= QSO B0133+476 =

Blazar in the constellation of Andromeda

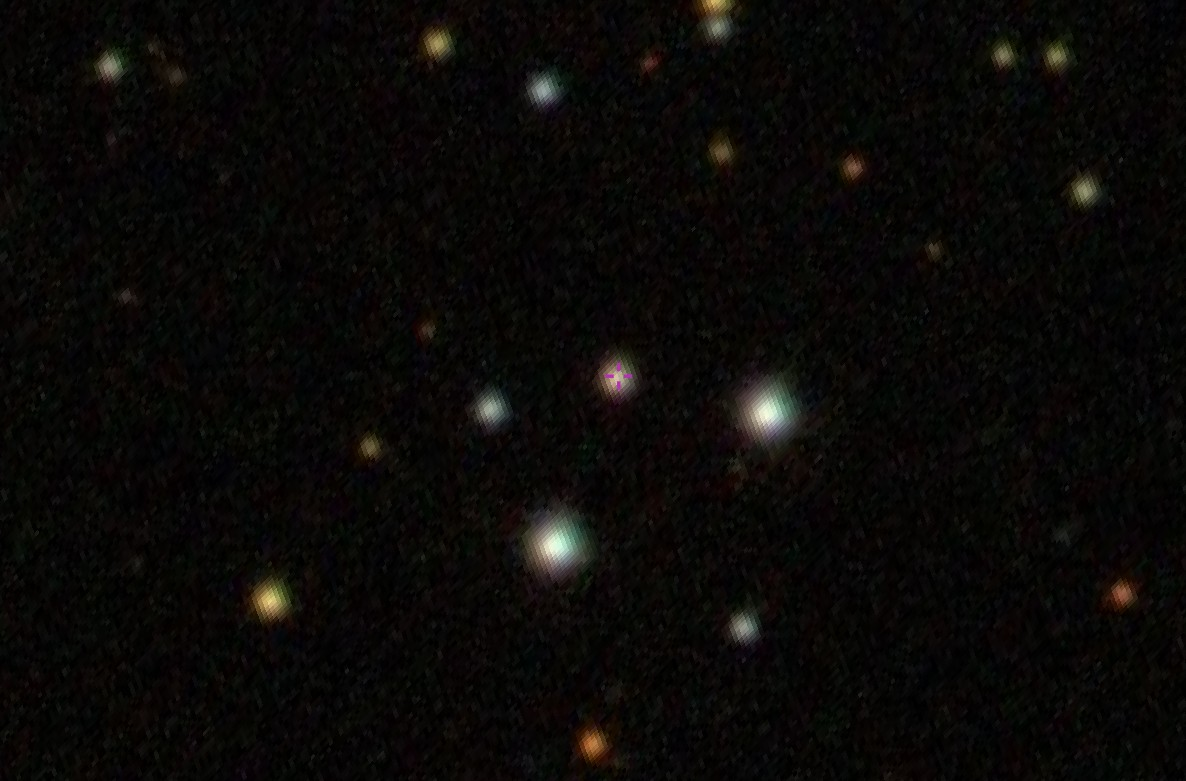
- The blazar QSO B0133+476.

Observation data (J2000.0 epoch)
- Constellation: Andromeda
- Right ascension: 01^{h} 36^{m} 58.5948^{s}
- Declination: +47° 51′ 29.100″
- Redshift: 0.859000
- Heliocentric radial velocity: 257,522 km/s
- Distance: 6.916 Gly
- Apparent magnitude (V): 19.50

Characteristics
- Type: HPQ; Blazar, FSRQ

Other designations
- Mis V1436, OHIO C 457, DA 55, NVSS J013658+475129, S5 0133+47, WMAP 80, QSO J0136+4751, [MGL2009] BZQ J0136+4751, [HB93] 0133+476

QSO B0133+476, alternatively known as DA 55, is a blazar located in the constellation of Andromeda. Its redshift is (z) 0.859 and it was first discovered as an astronomical radio source by astronomers who conducted a survey at 1.4 GHz in 1970. This object has also been referred to as an optically violent variable (OVV) quasar due to its variability, a BL Lac object and a highly polarized quasar (HPQ).

== Description ==
QSO B0133+476 is in a constant active state. It is known to exhibit several outbursts showing longer outburst time scales at longer wavelengths and a recorded amplitude outburst reaching near 15 to 31 GHz, during observations spanning roughly one decade. Its pre-outburst spectrum, found relatively flat between 2.7 and 31.4 GHz, started rising and became inverted during an outburst in between 1973 and 1974. Between 1978 and 1980 it had another outburst with the peak of the spectrum reaching 8 GHz in 1979.5 and 2.7 GHz by 1980.3. When compared to the 1973-1974 outburst, the spectrum was much flatter which it subsequently broadened.

A flare was detected from QSO B0133+476 in the middle of July 2002, with a brightness increase to 14.3 magnitude. It was followed by another flare detected from November 2024 during which the flux density rose steadily to 16.1 magnitude between January 20 and 21 2025. Near-infrared activity was detected towards the end of 2008, in 2011 and again in February 2013.

The source of QSO B0133+476 is classified as double. Based on polarization images presented by Very Long Baseline Interometry, it has a compact radio structure, mainly comprising an elongated strong radio core, a faint weak secondary component that is located 3.7 milliarcseconds (mas) from the core and signs of an extended diffused structure in the west direction. Observations also showed most of the radio emission is contained within the core, which in turn has a flat spectrum and a rest-frame rotation measure of -1420 ± 56 rad m^{−2}. When imaged by the Very Long Baseline Array (VLBA) at 1.7, 4.8 and 8.4 GHz frequencies, the source instead shows a core-jet morphology with its emission being dominated by a bright component and a jet resolving into a wiggled tail-like structure.
