= PKS 1502+036 =

Narrow-line Seyfert galaxy in the constellation Virgo

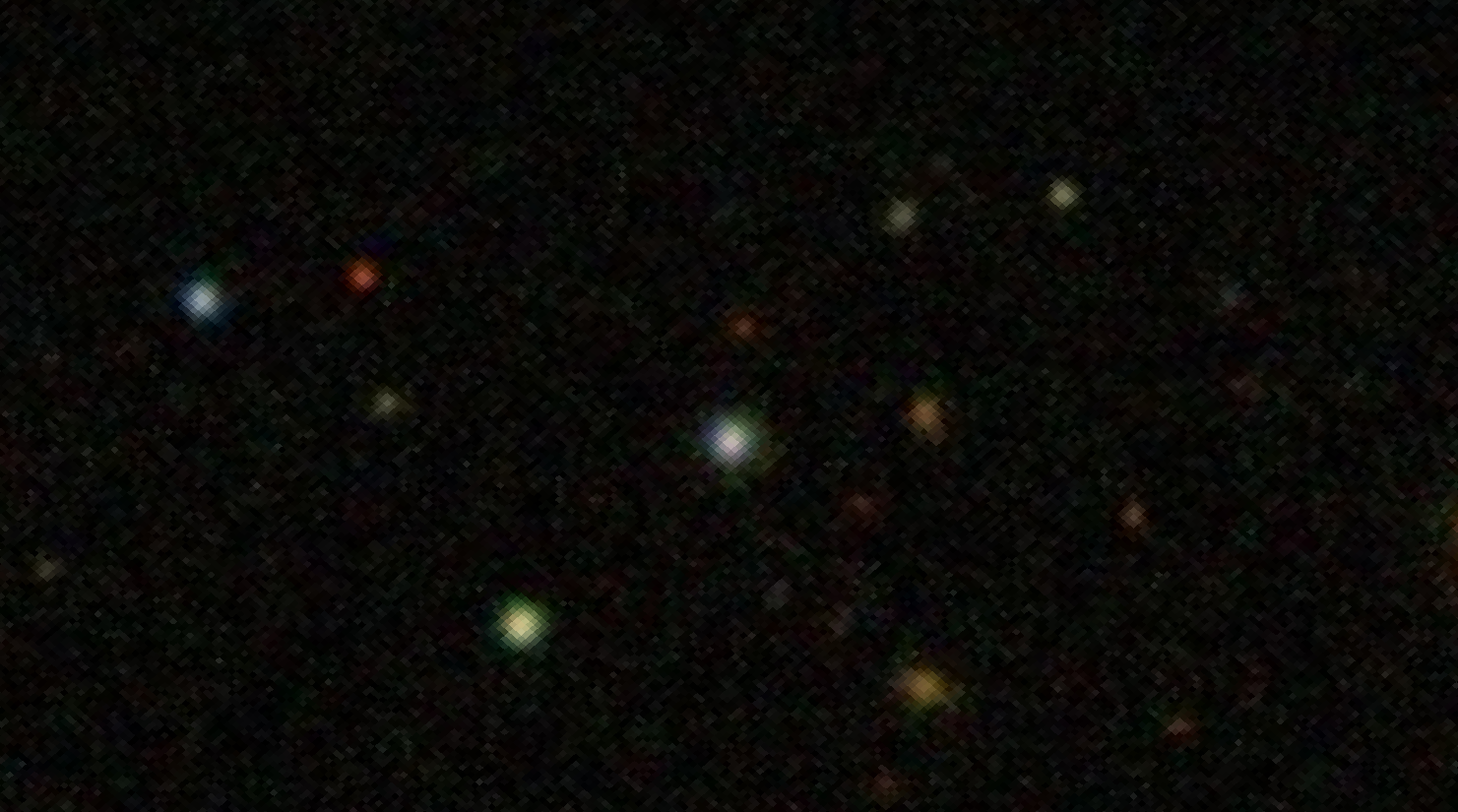
- SDSS image of PKS 1502+036

Observation data (J2000.0 epoch)
- Constellation: Virgo
- Right ascension: 15^{h} 05^{m} 06.47^{s}
- Declination: +03° 26′ 30.81″
- Redshift: 0.408269
- Heliocentric radial velocity: 122,396 km/s
- Distance: 4.489 Gly
- Apparent magnitude (V): 18.62

Characteristics
- Type: FSRQ NLSy1
- Size: ~216,000 ly (66.3 kpc) (estimated)
- Notable features: Narrow-line Seyfert galaxy

Other designations
- 2MASS J15050647+0326308, NVSS J150506+0326030, IERS B1502+036, SDSS J1505+0326, PGC 3429114

PKS 1502+036 is a narrow-line Seyfert galaxy located in the constellation of Virgo. The redshift of the object has been estimated as (z) 0.408 and it was first discovered as a quasar with a flat radio spectrum by astronomers in 1997. It is described as radio-loud.

== Description ==
PKS 1502+036 is shown to be a gamma-ray emitting object, with one powerful flare displayed in late 2015 after a long period of low-activity with a measured low flux of 4.5×10^{−8} photon cm^{−2} s^{−1}. By the time the flare reached a daily peak flux on December 20, 2015, the source had an estimated flux of (237±71)×10^{−8} photon cm^{−2} s^{−1} on a three-hour timescale which in turn, corresponds to a measured isotropic luminosity of (7.3±2.1)×10^{47} erg s^{−1}. No signs of spectral changes were accompanying the flare, although an increase in optical, ultraviolet and X-ray activity was noted for the object. During intra-night optical monitoring, the source displayed short-term optical variability between April 21 and May 11, 2018, with a brightness change of 0.1 magnitude.

The source of PKS 1502+036 is classified as compact double. When imaged with Very Long Baseline Array (VLBA) at 15 GHz, it has an extended radio structure indicative of a core-jet morphology, with radio emission being dominated by a compact radio core that is shown having low fractional polarization and a weak jet-like feature extending out by three milliarcseconds. A weak component with a separation of 3.05 milliarcseconds from its core, appears present in the source which was found undetected through previous observations. The radio spectrum of the source is classified as inverted.

Near-infrared imaging obtained by Very Large Telescope, found PKS 1502+036 is an elliptical galaxy based on its surface brightness profile described by a combination of bulge and a nuclear component modelling. There is also a presence of an extended structure in a form of bright spots with position angles between 270 and 370 degrees indicative of galaxy mergers. On the other side of the galaxy center, a more dim extended bar-like structure is seen going from east-southeast to north direction. The supermassive black hole mass for the galaxy has been estimated as7×10^{8} M_{☉} based on its near-infrared bulge luminosity. There is a close companion near the galaxy, however it isn't interacting with it.
