= Summation equation =

Equation composed of a function being summed

In mathematics, a summation equation or discrete integral equation is an equation in which an unknown function appears under a summation sign. The theories of summation equations and integral equations can be unified as integral equations on time scales using time scale calculus. A summation equation compares to a difference equation as an integral equation compares to a differential equation.

The Volterra summation equation is: $x(t) = f(t) + \sum_{s=m}^n k \bigl( t, s, x(s) \bigr)$ where x is the unknown function, s, t are integers, and f, k are known functions.
