= IERS B2352+495 =

Radio galaxy in the constellation of Cassiopeia

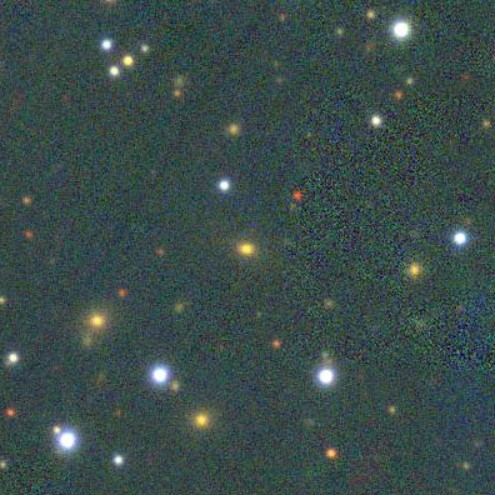
- The radio galaxy IERS B2352+495.

Observation data (J2000.0 epoch)
- Constellation: Cassiopeia
- Right ascension: 23^{h} 55^{m} 09.458^{s}
- Declination: +49° 50′ 08.33″
- Redshift: 0.237900
- Heliocentric radial velocity: 71,321 km/s
- Distance: 2.711 Gly
- Apparent magnitude (B): 21.10

Characteristics
- Type: AGN2
- Notable features: Compact symmetrical object

Other designations
- NVSS J235509+495008, DA 611, OZ +488, TXS 2352+495, ICRF J235509.4+495008, 2352+495

IERS B2352+495 is a radio galaxy located 2.7 billion light-years in the constellation of Cassiopeia. Its redshift is (z) 0.237. It was first discovered as a radio source displaying a flat radio spectra by astronomers in 1978 and subsequently identified with its counterpart in 1979.

== Description ==
IERS B2352+495 is hosted by an elliptical galaxy. It is described as an example of a prototype compact symmetrical object with a radio luminosity of 4.8 × 10^{43} h^{−2} erg s^{−1}. It is a Gigahertz peaked spectrum source. The galaxy shows weak variability on timescales and low polarization of 0.2% to 0.7%. The central supermassive black hole mass for this galaxy is estimated to be 1.58 × 10^{8} M_{☉}.

The radio structure of IERS B2352+495 is found to be symmetrical, according to P.N. Wilkinson who identified it showing two mini-lobes in the outer part. It is a triple source; mainly made up of a compact component, a much weaker but large component and a middle component that is split into two other subcomponents. When shown at multi-epoch observations by Very Long Baseline Array, it has hotspots and a radio core. The hotspots show no evidence of superluminal motion. Imaging observations at milliarcseconds showed the source contains multiple components, with most of its flux contained inside two of its components in the core region. A narrow radio jet can be en seen south of the component, possibly disrupted by an interstellar material encounter.

An investigation showed the hotspot components of IERS B2352+495 as well separated. Based from observations these components are estimated to have angular separations of 21.06 ± 2.70 per year which in turn, corresponds to a velocity separation of 0.20 ± 0.02 per hour. These hotspots also have estimated pressure masses of 2 × 10^{11} M_{☉}. H I absorption has been discovered towards the galaxy with the spectrum displaying broad and narrow components redshifted by 129.9 ± 0.8 kilometers per seconds.

In August 1994, IERS B2352+495 displayed an extreme scattering event. Based from observations the galactic foreground of the source is shown to be coincident with the galactic continuum, without signs of a shell-like structure.
