= Herbert Wilf =

American mathematician

Herbert Saul Wilf
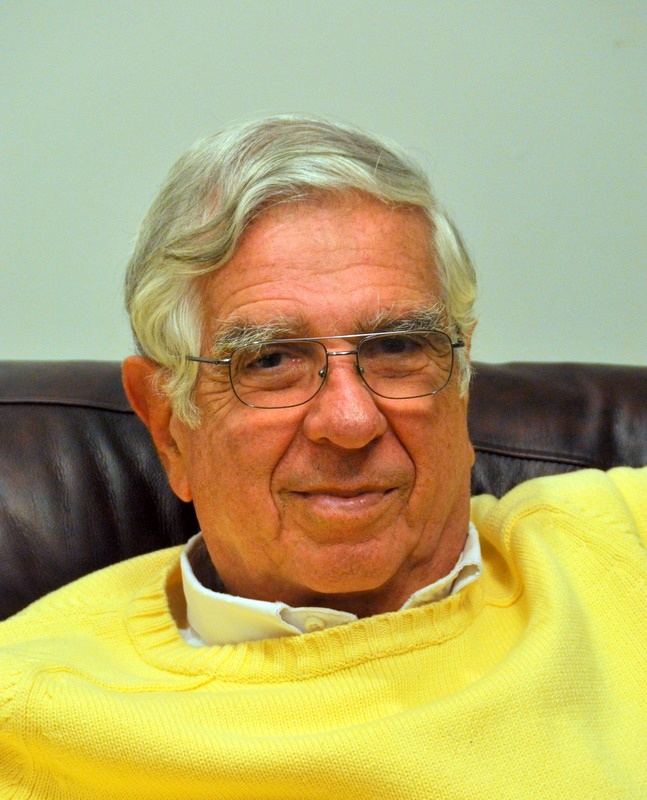
- Born: June 13, 1931; Philadelphia, Pennsylvania, U.S.
- Died: January 7, 2012 (aged 80); Wynnewood, Pennsylvania, U.S.
- Education: Columbia University; Massachusetts Institute of Technology
- Known for: Combinatorics; Wilf equivalence Wilf number Wilf's sequence Wilf–Zeilberger pair Calkin–Wilf tree Stanley–Wilf conjecture Szekeres–Wilf number
- Awards: Leroy P. Steele Prize (1998); Euler Medal (2002)
- Scientific career
- Fields: Mathematician
- Workplaces: University of Pennsylvania
- Thesis: The Transmission of Neutrons in Multilayered Slab Geometry (1958)
- Doctoral advisor: Herbert Ellis Robbins
- Doctoral students: Fan Chung; Richard Garfield; Rodica Simion; E. Roy Weintraub; Michael Wertheimer; Ebadollah S. Mahmoodian

Herbert Saul Wilf (June 13, 1931 – January 7, 2012) was an American mathematician, specializing in combinatorics and graph theory. He was the Thomas A. Scott Professor of Mathematics in Combinatorial Analysis and Computing at the University of Pennsylvania. He wrote numerous books and research papers. Together with Neil Calkin he founded The Electronic Journal of Combinatorics in 1994 and was its editor-in-chief until 2001.

== Biography ==
Wilf was the author of numerous papers and books, and was adviser and mentor to many students and colleagues. His collaborators include Doron Zeilberger and Donald Knuth. One of Wilf's former students is Richard Garfield, the creator of the collectible card game Magic: The Gathering. He also served as a thesis advisor for E. Roy Weintraub in the late 1960s.

Wilf died of a progressive neuromuscular disease in 2012.

== Awards ==
In 1996, Wilf received the Deborah and Franklin Haimo Award for Distinguished College or University Teaching of Mathematics.

In 1998, Wilf and Zeilberger received the Leroy P. Steele Prize for Seminal Contribution to Research for their joint paper, "Rational functions certify combinatorial identities" (Journal of the American Mathematical Society, 3 (1990) 147–158). The prize citation reads: "New mathematical ideas can have an impact on experts in a field, on people outside the field, and on how the field develops after the idea has been introduced. The remarkably simple idea of the work of Wilf and Zeilberger has already changed a part of mathematics for the experts, for the high-level users outside the area, and the area itself." Their work has been translated into computer packages that have simplified hypergeometric summation.

In 2002, Wilf was awarded the Euler Medal by the Institute of Combinatorics and its Applications.

== Selected publications ==
- Wilf, Herbert S. (1961). "Perron-Frobenius theory and the zeroes of polynomials". Proc. Amer. Math. Soc. 12 (2): 247–250. doi:10.1090/s0002-9939-1961-0120352-5. MR 0120352.
- Wilf, Herbert S. (1961). "The argument of an entire function". Bull. Amer. Math. Soc. 67 (5): 488–489. doi:10.1090/s0002-9904-1961-10649-6. MR 0131549.
- Wilf, H. S. (February 1961). "The Possibility of Tschebycheff Quadrature on Infinite Intervals". Proc Natl Acad Sci U S A. 47 (2): 209–213. Bibcode:1961PNAS...47..209W. doi:10.1073/pnas.47.2.209. PMC 221658. PMID 16590820.
- Szekeres, G.; Wilf, Herbert S. (January 1968). "An inequality for the chromatic number of a graph". Journal of Combinatorial Theory. 4 (1): 1–3. doi:10.1016/S0021-9800(68)80081-X.
- 1971: (editor with Frank Harary) Mathematical Aspects of Electrical Networks Analysis, SIAM-AMS Proceedings, Volume 3,American Mathematical Society MR 0329788
- 1998: (with N. J. Calkin) "The Number of Independent Sets in a Grid Graph", SIAM Journal on Discrete Mathematics

=== Books ===
- A=B (with Doron Zeilberger and Marko Petkovšek)
- "Algorithms and Complexity". math.upenn.edu.
- "generatingfunctionology". math.upenn.edu.
- "Mathematics for the Physical Sciences". math.upenn.edu.
- Combinatorial Algorithms, with Albert Nijenhuis

=== Lecture notes ===
- "East Side, West Side". math.upenn.edu.
- "Lectures on Integer Partitions" (PDF). math.upenn.edu.
- Deturck, Dennis; Wilf. "Lecture Notes on Numerical Analysis" (PDF).

== See also ==
- Line graph
