= Hypergeometric identity =

Equalities involving sums over the coefficients occurring in hypergeometric series

In mathematics, hypergeometric identities are equalities involving sums over hypergeometric terms, i.e. the coefficients occurring in hypergeometric series. These identities occur frequently in solutions to combinatorial problems, and also in the analysis of algorithms.

These identities were traditionally found 'by hand'. There exist now several algorithms which can find and prove all hypergeometric identities.

== Examples ==
$$\sum_{i=0}^{n} {n \choose i} = 2^{n}$$

$$\sum_{i=0}^{n} {n \choose i}^2 = {2n \choose n}$$

$$\sum_{k=0}^{n} k {n \choose k} = n2^{n-1}$$

$$\sum_{i=n}^{N} i{i \choose n} = (n+1){N+2\choose n+2}-{N+1\choose n+1}$$

== Definition ==
There are two definitions of hypergeometric terms, both used in different cases as explained below. See also hypergeometric series.

A term t_{k} is a hypergeometric term if

$$\frac{t_{k+1}}{t_k}$$

is a rational function in k.

A term F(n,k) is a hypergeometric term if

$$\frac{F(n,k+1)}{F(n,k)}$$

is a rational function in k.

There exist two types of sums over hypergeometric terms, the definite and indefinite sums. A definite sum is of the form

$$\sum_{k} t_k.$$

The indefinite sum is of the form

$$\sum_{k=0}^{n} F(n,k).$$

== Proofs ==
Although in the past proofs have been found for many specific identities, there exist several general algorithms to find and prove identities. These algorithms first find a simple expression for a sum over hypergeometric terms and then provide a certificate which anyone can use to check and prove the correctness of the identity.

For each of the hypergeometric sum types there exist one or more methods to find a simple expression. These methods also provide the certificate to check the identity's proof:

- Definite sums: Sister Celine's Method, Zeilberger's algorithm
- Indefinite sums: Gosper's algorithm

The book A = B by Marko Petkovšek, Herbert Wilf and Doron Zeilberger describes the three main approaches mentioned above.

== See also ==
- Table of Newtonian series
