= Ebadollah S. Mahmoodian =

Iranian mathematician (1943–2024)

- سید عبادالله محمودیان
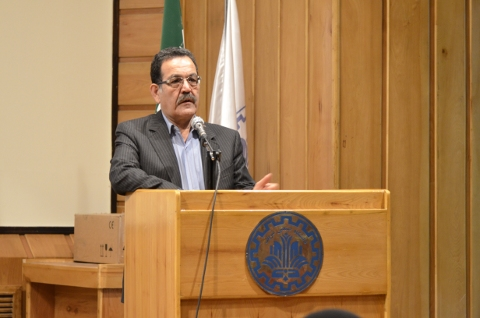
- Born: 18 May 1943; Zanjan, Iran
- Died: 28 December 2024 (aged 81)
- Education: University of Pennsylvania
- Scientific career
- Thesis: A Critical Case Method of Proof in Combinatorial Mathematics (1975)
- Doctoral advisor: Herbert Wilf

Ebadollah S. Mahmoodian (Persian: سید عبادالله محمودیان — Seyyed Ebadollah Mahmudian; 18 May 1943 – 28 December 2024) was an Iranian academic and mathematician who was professor of mathematics at the Mathematical Sciences Department of Sharif University of Technology.

== Life and career ==
Mahmoodian was a professor of mathematics at the Mathematical Sciences Department of Sharif University of Technology for 41 years starting from 1983.

He co-edited Combinatorics Advances.

Mahmoodian contributed to graph theory, in particular graph colouring. He had also worked on combinatorial designs, in particular, defining sets, and the relations between all those areas.

Mahmoodian died on 28 December 2024, at the age of 81.
