= E. Roy Weintraub =

American mathematician (born 1943)

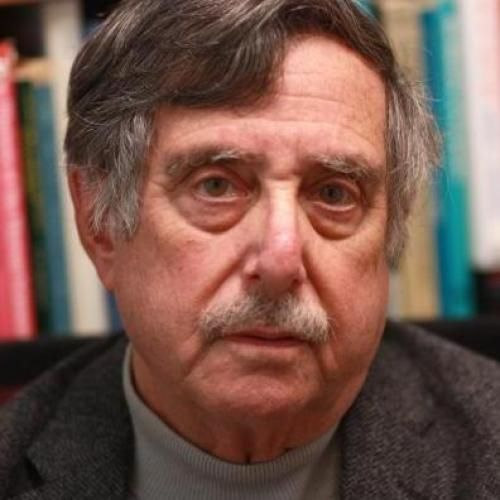
- Born: March 22, 1943 (age 83); New York City, U.S.
- Education: Swarthmore College (BA); University of Pennsylvania (MA, PhD)
- Scientific career
- Fields: Applied mathematics, economics
- Workplaces: Duke University
- Thesis: Stochastic Stability of a General Equilibrium Model (1969)
- Doctoral advisor: Lawrence Klein; Herbert Wilf

Eliot Roy Weintraub (/ˈwaɪntrɑːb/; born March 22, 1943) is an American economist and applied mathematician who is a professor emeritus of economics at Duke University. He has previously held positions at Rutgers University, the University of Bristol, and the University of California, Los Angeles (UCLA), among others. He is a former president and a distinguished fellow of the History of Economics Society.

== Life and education ==
E. Roy Weintraub is the son of the economist Sidney Weintraub. A native of the Philadelphia area, Weintraub received an A.B. degree (1964, mathematics) from Swarthmore College and M.S. and Ph.D. degrees (1967 and 1969, applied mathematics) from the University of Pennsylvania. His Ph.D. thesis advisors were Lawrence Klein and Herbert Wilf. He lives with his family in Durham, North Carolina. His papers have been donated to Duke University.

== Career ==
Weintraub joined the Duke University faculty in 1970 following a first academic position at Rutgers University. At Duke he was director of graduate studies in the Department of Economics from 1972 to 1983, chair of that department from 1983 to 1987, acting director of the Institute of Statistics and Decision Sciences in 1987, director of the Center for Social and Historical Studies of Science from 1995 to 1999, and has twice chaired the academic council. From 1993 to 1995, he served as acting dean of the Faculty of Arts and Sciences. He played a pivotal role in establishing both the Economists' Papers Archive in 1983 and the Center for the History of Political Economy in 2008. He has served terms on the advisory committee on appointments, promotion, and tenure, the academics priorities committee, the faculty compensation committee, and has chaired the president's advisory committee on resources. He served for many years as a pre-major advisor and a teacher of first-year seminars. In 1992 he won the Howard Johnson Foundation Distinguished Undergraduate Teaching Award. He has been director of the Honors Program for the Department of Economics, and Faculty Fellow in the former Edens Federation for Residential Life. He is currently associate editor of the journal History of Political Economy, and was co-editor of the book series Cambridge Surveys of Economic Literature and Duke Press's Science and Cultural Theory.

== Scholarly contributions ==
Weintraub's research has traced the connection between mathematics and economics at technical, methodological or historical, and micro and macro levels. A broad theme of later work has been the transformation of economics from a historical to a mathematical discipline, as in General Equilibrium Analysis (1985), Stabilizing Dynamics: Constructing Economic Knowledge (1991); How Economics Became a Mathematical Science (2002), and Finding Equilibrium: Arrow, Debreu, McKenzie and the Problem of Scientific Credit (co-authored with Till Düppe) (2014) were each awarded the Joseph J. Spengler prize for best book by the History of Economics Society. He also wrote for and edited Towards a History of Game Theory (1993) and more recently two historiographic volumes. His books have been translated into multiple languages, including Japanese, Chinese, French, Spanish, Hungarian, and Italian.

In 1988–1989, Weintraub was awarded a fellowship at the National Humanities Center, where he pursued research on "The Creation of Modern Economics: 1935–1955." His engagement with historians and literary theorists during this fellowship led to the publication of Stabilizing Dynamics: Constructing Economic Knowledge (1991). The book's arguments engaged with non-economists like David Bloor, Stanley Fish, Bruno Latour, and Hayden White. Weintraub's book marked a significant methodological shift in the historiography of economics. His subsequent research, conducted in parallel with that of Philip Mirowski, has further advanced methodological innovations by emphasizing the importance of science studies approaches in understanding the history of economics.
