= Abramov's algorithm =

In mathematics, particularly in computer algebra, Abramov's algorithm computes all rational solutions of a linear recurrence equation with polynomial coefficients. The algorithm was published by Sergei A. Abramov in 1989.

== Universal denominator ==
The main concept in Abramov's algorithm is a universal denominator. Let $\mathbb{K}$ be a field of characteristic zero. The dispersion $\operatorname{dis} (p,q)$ of two polynomials $p, q \in \mathbb{K}[n]$ is defined as$\operatorname{dis} (p,q) =\max \{ k \in \N \, : \, \deg (\gcd (p(n), q(n+k) )) \geq 1 \} \cup \{ -1 \},$where $\N$ denotes the set of non-negative integers. Therefore the dispersion is the maximum $k \in \N$ such that the polynomial $p$ and the $k$-times shifted polynomial $q$ have a common factor. It is $-1$ if such a $k$ does not exist. The dispersion can be computed as the largest non-negative integer root of the resultant $\operatorname{res}_n (p(n), q(n+k) ) \in \mathbb{K}[k]$. Let $\sum_{k=0}^r p_k(n) \, y (n+k) = f(n)$ be a recurrence equation of order $r$ with polynomial coefficients $p_k \in \mathbb{K} [n]$, polynomial right-hand side $f \in \mathbb{K}[n]$ and rational sequence solution $y (n) \in \mathbb{K}(n)$. It is possible to write $y (n) = p(n)/q(n)$ for two relatively prime polynomials $p, q \in \mathbb{K}[n]$. Let $D=\operatorname{dis} (p_r(n-r), p_0 (n) )$ and$u(n) = \gcd ([p_0 (n+D)]^{\underline{D+1}}, [p_r (n-r)]^{\underline{D+1}})$where $[p(n)]^{\underline{k}}=p(n)p(n-1)\cdots p(n-k+1)$ denotes the falling factorial of a function. Then $q(n)$ divides $u(n)$. So the polynomial $u(n)$ can be used as a denominator for all rational solutions $y(n)$ and hence it is called a universal denominator.

== Algorithm ==
Let again $\sum_{k=0}^r p_k(n) \, y (n+k) = f(n)$ be a recurrence equation with polynomial coefficients and $u(n)$ a universal denominator. After substituting $y (n) = z(n)/u(n)$ for an unknown polynomial $z(n) \in \mathbb{K} [n]$ and setting $\ell(n) = \operatorname{lcm}(u(n), \dots, u(n+r))$ the recurrence equation is equivalent to$\sum_{k=0}^r p_k (n) \frac{z(n+k)}{u(n+k)} \ell(n) = f(n) \ell(n).$As the $u(n+k)$ cancel this is a linear recurrence equation with polynomial coefficients which can be solved for an unknown polynomial solution $z(n)$. There are algorithms to find polynomial solutions. The solutions for $z(n)$ can then be used again to compute the rational solutions $y(n) = z(n)/u(n)$.

algorithm rational_solutions is
    input: Linear recurrence equation 
  
    
      
        
          ∑
          
            k
            =
            0
          
          
            r
          
        
        
          p
          
            k
          
        
        (
        n
        )
        
        y
        (
        n
        +
        k
        )
        =
        f
        (
        n
        )
        ,
        
          p
          
            k
          
        
        ,
        f
        ∈
        
          K
        
        [
        n
        ]
        ,
        
          p
          
            0
          
        
        ,
        
          p
          
            r
          
        
        ≠
        0
      
    
    {\textstyle \sum _{k=0}^{r}p_{k}(n)\,y(n+k)=f(n),p_{k},f\in \mathbb {K} [n],p_{0},p_{r}\neq 0}
  
.
    output: The general rational solution 
  
    
      
        y
      
    
    {\textstyle y}
  
 if there are any solutions, otherwise false.

    
  
    
      
        D
        =
        disp
        ⁡
        (
        
          p
          
            r
          
        
        (
        n
        −
        r
        )
        ,
        
          p
          
            0
          
        
        (
        n
        )
        )
      
    
    {\textstyle D=\operatorname {disp} (p_{r}(n-r),p_{0}(n))}
  

    
  
    
      
        u
        (
        n
        )
        =
        gcd
        (
        [
        
          p
          
            0
          
        
        (
        n
        +
        D
        )
        
          ]
          
            
              
                D
                +
                1
              
              _
            
          
        
        ,
        [
        
          p
          
            r
          
        
        (
        n
        −
        r
        )
        
          ]
          
            
              
                D
                +
                1
              
              _
            
          
        
        )
      
    
    {\textstyle u(n)=\gcd([p_{0}(n+D)]^{\underline {D+1}},[p_{r}(n-r)]^{\underline {D+1}})}
  

    
  
    
      
        ℓ
        (
        n
        )
        =
        lcm
        ⁡
        (
        u
        (
        n
        )
        ,
        …
        ,
        u
        (
        n
        +
        r
        )
        )
      
    
    {\textstyle \ell (n)=\operatorname {lcm} (u(n),\dots ,u(n+r))}
  

    Solve 
  
    
      
        
          ∑
          
            k
            =
            0
          
          
            r
          
        
        
          p
          
            k
          
        
        (
        n
        )
        
          
            
              z
              (
              n
              +
              k
              )
            
            
              u
              (
              n
              +
              k
              )
            
          
        
        ℓ
        (
        n
        )
        =
        f
        (
        n
        )
        ℓ
        (
        n
        )
      
    
    {\textstyle \sum _{k=0}^{r}p_{k}(n){\frac {z(n+k)}{u(n+k)}}\ell (n)=f(n)\ell (n)}
  
 for general polynomial solution 
  
    
      
        z
        (
        n
        )
      
    
    {\textstyle z(n)}
  

    if solution 
  
    
      
        z
        (
        n
        )
      
    
    {\textstyle z(n)}
  
 exists then
        return general solution 
  
    
      
        y
        (
        n
        )
        =
        z
        (
        n
        )
        
          /
        
        u
        (
        n
        )
      
    
    {\textstyle y(n)=z(n)/u(n)}
  

    else
        return false
    end if

== Example ==
The homogeneous recurrence equation of order $1$$(n-1) \, y(n) + (-n-1) \, y(n+1) = 0$over $\Q$ has a rational solution. It can be computed by considering the dispersion$D = \operatorname{dis} (p_1 (n-1), p_0 (n) ) = \operatorname{disp} (-n,n-1) = 1.$This yields the following universal denominator:$u(n) = \gcd ([p_0 (n+1)]^{\underline{2}}, [p_r (n-1)]^{\underline{2}}) = (n-1)n$and$\ell(n) = \operatorname{lcm} (u(n), u(n+1) ) = (n-1)n(n+1).$Multiplying the original recurrence equation with $\ell(n)$ and substituting $y(n) = z(n)/u(n)$ leads to$(n-1)(n+1)\, z(n) + (-n-1) (n-1) \, z(n+1) = 0.$This equation has the polynomial solution $z(n) = c$ for an arbitrary constant $c \in \Q$. Using $y(n) = z(n) / u(n)$ the general rational solution is$y(n) = \frac{c}{(n-1)n}$for arbitrary $c \in \Q$.

WikiProject Mathematics on Wikidata
