= Wilf–Zeilberger pair =

Pair of functions in combinatorics

In mathematics, specifically combinatorics, a Wilf–Zeilberger pair, or WZ pair, is a pair of functions that can be used to certify certain combinatorial identities. WZ pairs are named after Herbert S. Wilf and Doron Zeilberger, and are instrumental in the evaluation of many sums involving binomial coefficients, factorials, and in general any hypergeometric series. A function's WZ counterpart may be used to find an equivalent and much simpler sum. Although finding WZ pairs by hand is impractical in most cases, Gosper's algorithm provides a method to find a function's WZ counterpart, and can be implemented in a symbolic manipulation program.

== Definition ==
Two functions F and G form a WZ pair if and only if the following two conditions hold:

$$F(n+1,k)-F(n,k) = G(n,k+1)-G(n,k),$$
$$\lim_{M \to \pm\infty}G(n,M) = 0.$$

== Properties ==
From the definition it follows that

$$\sum_{k=-\infty}^\infty [F(n+1,k)-F(n,k)] = 0$$

because the function G telescopes:

$$\begin{align} \sum_{k=-\infty}^\infty [F(n+1,k)-F(n,k)]
& {} = \lim_{M \to \infty} \sum_{k=-M}^M[F(n+1,k)-F(n,k)] \\
& {} = \lim_{M \to \infty} \sum_{k=-M}^M [G(n,k+1)-G(n,k)] \\
& {} = \lim_{M \to \infty} [G(n,M+1)-G(n,-M)] \\
& {} = 0-0 \\
& {} = 0.
\end{align}$$

Therefore,

$$\sum_{k=-\infty}^\infty F(n+1,k) = \sum_{k=-\infty}^\infty F(n,k),$$

that is

$$\sum_{k=-\infty}^\infty F(n,k) = \text{const}.$$

The constant does not depend on n. Its value can be found by substituting n = n_{0} for a particular n_{0}.

If F and G form a WZ pair, then they satisfy the relation

$$G(n,k) = R(n,k) F(n,k-1),$$

where $R(n,k)$ is a rational function of n and k and is called the WZ proof certificate.

== Example ==
A Wilf–Zeilberger pair can be used to verify the identity

$$\sum_{k=0}^\infty (-1)^k {n \choose k} {2k \choose k} 4^{n-k} = {2n \choose n}.$$

Divide the identity by its right-hand side:

$$\sum_{k=0}^\infty \frac{(-1)^k {n \choose k} {2k \choose k} 4^{n-k}}{{2n \choose n}} = 1.$$

Use the proof certificate

$$R(n,k)=\frac{2k-1}{2n+1}$$

to verify that the left-hand side does not depend on n, where

$$\begin{align}
F(n,k)&=\frac{(-1)^k {n \choose k} {2k \choose k} 4^{n-k}}{{2n \choose n}}, \\
G(n,k)&=R(n,k)F(n,k-1).
\end{align}$$

Now F and G form a Wilf–Zeilberger pair.

To prove that the constant in the right-hand side of the identity is 1, substitute n = 0, for instance.

== See also ==
- Almkvist–Zeilberger method, an analog of WZ method for evaluating definite integrals.
- List of mathematical identities
