= Marko Petkovšek =

Slovenian mathematician (1955–2023)

Marko Petkovšek (1955 – 24 March 2023) was a Slovenian mathematician working mainly in symbolic computation. He was a professor of discrete and computational mathematics at the University of Ljubljana. He is best known for Petkovšek's algorithm, and for the book that he coauthored with Herbert Wilf and Doron Zeilberger, A = B.

== Education and career ==
Petkovšek was born in 1955 in Ljubljana, Slovenia. He attended the University of Ljubljana for his bachelors and masters degrees, which he finished respectively in 1978 and 1986. He completed his PhD at Carnegie Mellon University under the supervision of Dana Scott, with a thesis titled Finding Closed-Form Solutions of Difference Equations by Symbolic Methods. After his PhD, he returned to Ljubljana and a job at the University of Ljubljana.

Petkovšek retired from the University of Ljubljana in 2021, and died in 2023.

== Books ==
- Petkovšek, Marko; Wilf, Herbert; Zeilberger, Doron (1996). A = B. A. K. Peters/CRC Press. ISBN 9781568810638.
