= Robert F. Coleman =

American mathematician

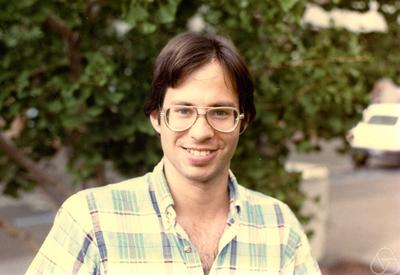
- Robert Coleman at Oberwolfach in 1983
- Born: November 22, 1954
- Died: March 24, 2014 (aged 59)
- Education: Harvard University; Princeton University
- Known for: p-adic integration; Method of Coleman and Chabauty; Coleman-Mazur eigencurve; overconvergent p-adic modular forms
- Awards: MacArthur Fellow (1987); NSF-GRFP (1976); Intel STS (1972)
- Scientific career
- Fields: Mathematics
- Workplaces: University of California, Berkeley
- Doctoral advisor: Kenkichi Iwasawa

Robert Frederick Coleman (November 22, 1954 – March 24, 2014) was an American mathematician, and professor at the University of California, Berkeley.

== Biography ==
After graduating from Nova High School, he completed his bachelor's degree at Harvard University in 1976 and subsequently attended Cambridge University for Part III of the mathematical tripos. While there John H. Coates provided him with a problem for his doctoral thesis ("Division Values in Local Fields"), which he completed at Princeton University in 1979 under the advising of Kenkichi Iwasawa. He then had a one-year postdoctoral appointment at the Institute for Advanced Study and then taught at Harvard University for three years. In 1983, he moved to University of California, Berkeley. In 1985, he was struck with a severe case of multiple sclerosis, in which he lost the use of his legs. Despite this, he remained an active faculty member until his retirement in 2013. He was awarded a MacArthur fellowship in 1987.

Coleman died on March 24, 2014.

== Research ==
He worked primarily in number theory, with specific interests in p-adic analysis and arithmetic geometry. In particular, he developed a theory of p-adic integration analogous to the classical complex theory of abelian integrals. Applications of Coleman integration include an effective version of Chabauty's theorem concerning rational points on curves and a new proof of the Manin-Mumford conjecture, originally proved by Michel Raynaud. Coleman is also known for introducing p-adic Banach spaces into the study of modular forms and discovering important classicality criteria for overconvergent p-adic modular forms. With Barry Mazur, he introduced the eigencurve and established some of its fundamental properties. In 1990, Coleman found a gap in Manin's proof of the Mordell conjecture over function fields and managed to fill it in. With José Felipe Voloch, Coleman established an important unchecked compatibility in Benedict Gross's theory of companion forms.

Coleman's effective version of Chabauty's method only applies to curves that satisfy Chabauty's condition. In 2004 Minhyong Kim published a far-reaching generalization of Chabauty's method.

== Selected works ==
- Coleman, Robert F. (1979), "Division values in local fields.", Invent. Math., 53 (2): 91–116, Bibcode:1979InMat..53...91C, doi:10.1007/BF01390028, MR 0560409, S2CID 122569381 PhD thesis
- Coleman, Robert F. (1985), "Torsion points on curves and p-adic abelian integrals", Ann. of Math., 121 (1): 111–168, doi:10.2307/1971194, JSTOR 1971194, MR 0782557
- Coleman, Robert F. (1985), "Effective Chabauty", Duke Math. J., 52 (3): 765–770, doi:10.1215/s0012-7094-85-05240-8, MR 0808103
- Coleman, Robert F. (1987), "Ramified torsion points on curves", Duke Math. J., 54 (2): 615–640, doi:10.1215/s0012-7094-87-05425-1, MR 0899407
- Coleman, Robert F.; de Shalit, Ehud (1988), "p-adic regulators on curves and special values of p-adic L-functions", Invent. Math., 93 (2): 239–266, Bibcode:1988InMat..93..239C, doi:10.1007/bf01394332, MR 0948100, S2CID 122242212
- Coleman, Robert F. (1990), "Manin's proof of the Mordell conjecture over function fields", L'Enseignement Mathématique, 2e Série, 36 (3): 393–427, ISSN 0013-8584, MR 1096426, archived from the original on 2011-10-02
- Coleman, Robert F.; Voloch, José Felipe (1992), "Companion forms and Kodaira-Spencer theory", Invent. Math., 110: 263–281, Bibcode:1992InMat.110..263C, doi:10.1007/bf01231333, MR 1185584, S2CID 121416817
- Coleman, Robert F. (1996), "Classical and Overconvergent Modular Forms", Invent. Math., 124 (1–3): 215–241, Bibcode:1996InMat.124..215C, doi:10.1007/s002220050051, MR 1369416, S2CID 7995580
- Coleman, Robert F. (1997), "p-adic Banach spaces and families of modular forms.", Invent. Math., 127 (3): 417–479, Bibcode:1997InMat.127..417C, doi:10.1007/s002220050127, MR 1431135, S2CID 1677427
- Coleman, R.; Mazur, B. (1998), "The eigencurve" ( (PDF)), Galois representations in arithmetic algebraic geometry (Durham, 1996), London Math. Soc. Lecture Note Ser., vol. 254, Cambridge: Cambridge Univ. Press, pp. 1–113, doi:10.1017/CBO9780511662010.003, ISBN 9780511662010, MR 1696469, archived from the original on 2011-06-07
- Coleman, Robert F. (2003), "Stable maps of curves", Doc. Math., Extra Volume for Kazuya Kato's fiftieth birthday: 217–225, MR 2046600, archived from the original on 2011-07-17
