= Telescope (disambiguation) =

A telescope is an instrument designed for the observation of remote objects.

Telescope(s) also may refer to:

== Music ==
- The Telescopes, a British psychedelic band
  - The Telescopes (album)
- Telescope (album), by Circle, 2007
- The Telescope (album), by Her Space Holiday, 2006
- Telescopes (EP), by Waking Ashland, 2006
- "Telescope" (song), by Hayden Panettiere, 2012
- "Telescope", a song by Cheryl Cole from A Million Lights, 2012
- "Telescopes", a song by Reks from Grey Hairs, 2008

== Other media ==
- Telescope (TV series), a 1963–1973 Canadian documentary program
- "The Telescope" (BoJack Horseman), a 2014 television episode
- The Telescope (magazine), an American monthly for amateur astronomers 1931–1941
- The Telescope (Magritte), a 1963 painting by René Magritte
- Telescope, a type of dolly zoom film/video shot
- The Telescope, a 1957 play by R. C. Sherriff

== Other uses ==
- Telescope (horse) (foaled 2010), an Irish Thoroughbred racehorse
- Telescopium, "The Telescope", a constellation

== See also ==
- Telescopic cylinder
- Telescopic sight
- Telescoping (mechanics)
- Telescoping (rail cars), collision event where a car is displaced into interior of another
- Telescoping effect, in which past events are recalled as having occurred more recently
- Telescoping (mathematics), a general cancellation phenomenon in iterated expressions
- Telescoping series, in mathematics
- Telescoping generations, in biology
