= Faulhaber's formula =

Expression for sums of powers of integers

In mathematics, Faulhaber's formula, named after the early 17th century mathematician Johann Faulhaber, expresses the sum of the $p$th powers of the first $n$ positive integers
$$\sum_{k=1}^{n} k^p = 1^p + 2^p + 3^p + \cdots + n^p$$
as a polynomial in $n$. In modern notation, Faulhaber's formula is
$$\sum_{k=1}^{n} k^{p} = \frac{1}{p+1} \sum_{r=0}^p \binom{p+1}{r} B_r^+n^{p+1-r} .$$
Here, $\binom{p+1}{r}$ is the binomial coefficient "$p + 1$ choose $r$", and the $B_r^+$ are the second Bernoulli numbers, identical to the first ones except for $B_1^+ = \frac12$.

== The result: Faulhaber's formula ==
Faulhaber's formula concerns expressing the sum of the $p$th powers of the first $n$ positive integers
$$\sum_{k=1}^{n} k^p = 1^p + 2^p + 3^p + \cdots + n^p$$
as a $(p + 1)$th-degree polynomial function of $n$.

For p = 2, six square pyramids with n steps fit in a cuboid of size n(n + 1)(2n + 1)

The first few examples are well known. For $p = 0$, we have
$$\sum_{k=1}^n k^0 = \sum_{k=1}^n 1 = n .$$
For $p = 1$, we have the triangular numbers
$$\sum_{k=1}^n k^1 = \sum_{k=1}^n k = \frac{n(n+1)}{2} = \frac12 \left(n^2 + n\right) .$$
For $p = 2$, we have the square pyramidal numbers
$$\sum_{k=1}^n k^2 = \frac{n(n+1)(2n+1)}{6} = \frac13 \left(n^3 + \tfrac32 n^2 + \tfrac12n\right) .$$

The coefficients of Faulhaber's formula in its general form involve the second Bernoulli numbers $B_j^+$ which nearly coincide with the first Bernoulli numbers denoted $B_j^-$ (or simply $B_j$); the sole exception is at $j=1$, where $B_1^-=-\tfrac12$ but $B_1^+=\tfrac12$. The Bernoulli numbers begin
$$\begin{align}
B_0 &= 1 & B_1^+ &= \tfrac12 & B_2 &= \tfrac16 & B_3 &= 0 \\
B_4 &= -\tfrac{1}{30} & B_5 &= 0 & B_6 &= \tfrac{1}{42} & B_7 &= 0 ,
\end{align}$$

Then Faulhaber's formula is that
$$\sum_{k=1}^n k^{p} = \frac{1}{p+1} \sum_{r=0}^p \binom{p+1}{r} B_r^+ n^{p+1-r} .$$
Here, the $B_j$ are the Bernoulli numbers as above, and
$$\binom{p+1}{r} = \frac{(p+1)!}{(p-r+1)!\,r!} = \frac{(p+1)p(p-1) \cdots (p-r+3)(p-r+2)}{r(r-1)(r-2)\cdots2\cdot 1}$$
is the binomial coefficient "$p + 1$ choose $r$".

== Examples ==
So, for example, one has for $p = 4$,
$$\begin{align} 1^4 + 2^4 + 3^4 + \cdots + n^4 &= \frac{1}{5} \sum_{j=0}^4 {5 \choose j} B_j^+ n^{5-j}\\
&= \frac{1}{5} \left(B_0 n^5+5B_1^+n^4+10B_2n^3+10B_3n^2+5B_4n\right)\\
&= \frac{1}{5} \left(n^5 + \tfrac{5}{2}n^4+ \tfrac{5}{3}n^3- \tfrac{1}{6}n \right) .\end{align}$$

The first seven examples of Faulhaber's formula are
$$\begin{align}
\sum_{k=1}^n k^0 &=	\frac{1}{1} \, \left(n \right) = n
\\ \sum_{k=1}^n k^1 &=	\frac{1}{2} \, \left(n^2 + \tfrac{2}{2} n \right) = \frac{n^{2}+n}{2}
\\ \sum_{k=1}^n k^2 &=	\frac{1}{3} \, \left(n^3 + \tfrac{3}{2} n^2 + \tfrac{ 3}{6} n \right) = \frac{2n^{3}+3n^{2}+n}{6}
\\ \sum_{k=1}^n k^3 &=	\frac{1}{4} \, \left(n^4 + \tfrac{4}{2} n^3 + \tfrac{ 6}{6} n^2 + 0n \right) = \frac{n^{4}+2n^{3}+n^{2}}{4}
\\ \sum_{k=1}^n k^4 &=	\frac{1}{5} \, \left(n^5 + \tfrac{5}{2} n^4 + \tfrac{10}{6} n^3 + 0n^2 - \tfrac{ 5}{30} n \right) = \frac{6n^{5}+15n^{4}+10n^{3}-n}{30}
\\ \sum_{k=1}^n k^5 &=	\frac{1}{6} \, \left(n^6 + \tfrac{6}{2} n^5 + \tfrac{15}{6} n^4 + 0n^3 - \tfrac{15}{30} n^2 + 0n \right) = \frac{2n^{6}+6n^{5}+5n^{4}-n^{2}}{12}
\\ \sum_{k=1}^n k^6 &=	\frac{1}{7} \, \left(n^7 + \tfrac{7}{2} n^6 + \tfrac{21}{6} n^5 + 0n^4 - \tfrac{35}{30} n^3 + 0n^2 + \tfrac{7}{42}n \right) = \frac{6n^{7}+21n^{6}+21n^{5}-7n^{3}+n}{42}
\end{align}$$
In their more familiar factored form and using Nichomacus's Theorem, we have
$$\begin{align}
\sum\limits_{k=1}^n k^{0} &=     \sum\limits_{k=1}^{n}\left(1\right)   =    n
\\ \sum\limits_{k=1}^n k^{1} &=	    \frac{n\left(n+1\right)}{2}
\\ \sum\limits_{k=1}^n k^{2} &= 	\frac{n\left(n+1\right)\left(2n+1\right)}{6}
\\[2ex] \sum\limits_{k=1}^n k^{3} &=	    \left[\sum\limits_{k=1}^n k^{1}\right]^{2} = \left[\frac{n\left(n+1\right)}{2}\right]^{2} = \frac{n^{2}\left(n+1\right)^{2}}{4}
\\[2ex] \sum\limits_{k=1}^n k^{4} &=	    \frac{\sum\limits_{k=1}^n k^2\left(6\left[\,\sum\limits_{k=1}^n k\right] - 1\right)}{5} = \frac{n(n+1)(2n+1)(3n^2+3n-1)}{30}
\\[2ex] \sum\limits_{k=1}^n k^{5} &=	    \frac{4\left[\,\sum\limits_{k=1}^n k^{1}\right]^{3}-\left[\,\sum\limits_{k=1}^n k^{1}\right]^{2}}{3}=\frac{n^2(n+1)^2(2n^2+2n-1)}{12}
\\[2ex] \sum\limits_{k=1}^n k^{6} &=	    \frac{\,\sum\limits_{k=1}^n k^2 \left(12\left[\,\sum\limits_{k=1}^n k\right]^2 - 6\left[\,\sum\limits_{k=1}^n k\right] + 1\right)}{7} = \frac{n(n+1)(2n+1)(3n^4+6n^3-3n+1)}{42}
\end{align}$$

== History ==
=== Ancient period ===
The history of the problem begins in antiquity, its special cases arising as solutions to related inquiries. The case $p = 1$ coincides historically with the problem of calculating the sum of the first $n$ terms of an arithmetic progression. In chronological order, early discoveries include:

- $1+2+\dots+n={}$$\frac{1}{2}n^2+\frac{1}{2}n,$ a formula known by the Pythagorean school for its connection with triangular numbers.
- $1+3+\dots+2n-1={}$$n^2$, a result showing that the sum of the first $n$ positive odd numbers is a perfect square. This formula was likely also known to the Pythagoreans, who in constructing figurate numbers realized that the gnomon of the $n$th perfect square is precisely the $n$th odd number.
- $1^2+2^2+\ldots+n^2={}$$\frac{1}{3}n^3+\frac{1}{2}n^2+\frac{1}{6}n,$ a formula that calculates the sum of the squares of the first $n$ positive integers, as demonstrated in Spirals, a work of Archimedes.
- $1^3+2^3+\ldots+n^3={}$$\frac{1}{4}n^4+\frac{1}{2}n^3+\frac{1}{4}n^2,$ a formula that calculates the sum of the cubes of the first $n$ positive integers, discovered as a corollary of a theorem of Nicomachus of Gerasa.

=== Middle period ===
Over time, many other mathematicians became interested in the problem and made various contributions to its solution. These include Aryabhata, Al-Karaji, Ibn al-Haytham, Thomas Harriot, Johann Faulhaber, Pierre de Fermat and Blaise Pascal who recursively solved the problem of the sum of powers of successive integers by considering an identity that allowed to obtain a polynomial of degree $m + 1$ already knowing the previous ones.

Faulhaber's formula is also called Bernoulli's formula. Faulhaber did not know the properties of the coefficients later discovered by Bernoulli. Rather, he knew at least the first 17 cases, as well as the existence of the Faulhaber polynomials for odd powers described below.

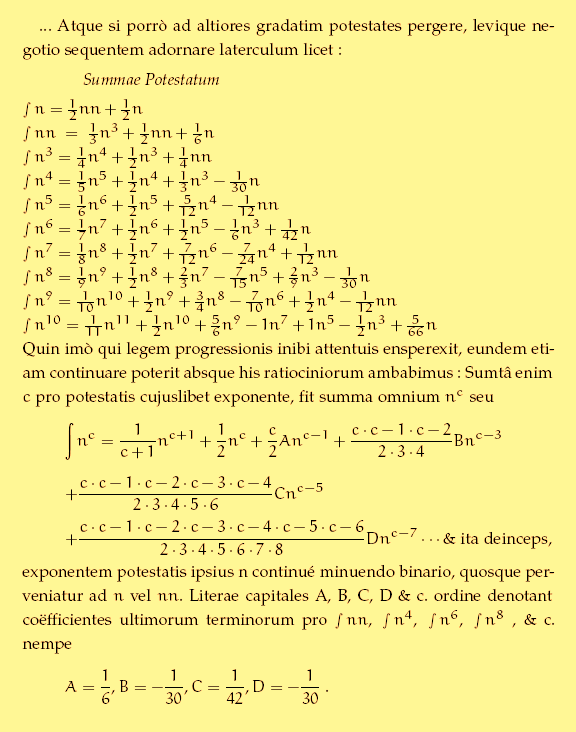
Jakob Bernoulli's Summae Potestatum, Ars Conjectandi, 1713

In 1713, Jacob Bernoulli published under the title Summae Potestatum an expression of the sum of the $p$ powers of the $n$ first integers as a $(p + 1)$th-degree polynomial function of $n$, with coefficients involving numbers $B_j$, now called Bernoulli numbers:
$$\sum_{k=1}^n k^{p} = \frac{n^{p+1}}{p+1}+\frac{1}{2}n^p+{1 \over p+1}
\sum_{j=2}^p {p+1 \choose j} B_j n^{p+1-j}.$$

Introducing also the first two Bernoulli numbers (which Bernoulli did not), the previous formula becomes
$$\sum_{k=1}^n k^p = {1 \over p+1} \sum_{j=0}^p {p+1 \choose j} B_j^+ n^{p+1-j},$$
using the Bernoulli number of the second kind for which $B_1^+=\frac{1}{2}$, or
$$\sum_{k=1}^n k^p = {1 \over p+1} \sum_{j=0}^p (-1)^j{p+1 \choose j} B_j n^{p+1-j},$$
using the Bernoulli number of the first kind $B_j=B_j^-$ for which $B_1=-\frac{1}{2}.$

A rigorous proof of these formulas and Faulhaber's assertion that such formulas would exist for all odd powers took until Carl Jacobi (1834), two centuries later. Jacobi benefited from the progress of mathematical analysis using the development in infinite series of an exponential function generating Bernoulli numbers.

=== Modern period ===
In 1982, A.W.F. Edwards published an article showing that Pascal's identity can be expressed by means of triangular matrices containing a modified Pascal's triangle:
$$\begin{pmatrix}
n\\
n^2\\
n^3\\
n^4\\
n^5\\
\end{pmatrix}=\begin{pmatrix}
1 &0 &0 &0 &0\\
1&2&0 &0 &0 \\
1&3&3&0 &0 \\
1&4&6&4 &0 \\
1&5&10&10&5
\end{pmatrix}\begin{pmatrix}
n\\
\sum_{k=0}^{n-1} k^1\\
\sum_{k=0}^{n-1} k^2\\
\sum_{k=0}^{n-1} k^3\\
\sum_{k=0}^{n-1} k^4\\
\end{pmatrix}$$

This example is limited by the choice of a fifth-order matrix, but the underlying method is easily extendable to higher orders. Writing the equation as $\vec{N}=A\vec{S}$ and multiplying the two sides of the equation to the left by $A^{-1}$, we obtain $A^{-1}\vec{N}=\vec{S}$, thereby arriving at the polynomial coefficients without directly using the Bernoulli numbers. Expanding on Edwards' work, some authors researching the power-sum problem have taken the matrix path, leveraging useful tools such as the Vandermonde vector. Other researchers continue to explore through the traditional analytic route, generalizing the problem of the sum of successive integers to any arithmetic progression.

== Polynomials calculating sums of powers of arithmetic progressions ==
Consider the problem of finding polynomials $S_{h,d}^p$ for any nonnegative integer $p$ such that
$$S_{h,d}^p(n)=\sum_{k=0}^{n-1}(h+kd)^p = h^p+(h+d)^p+\cdots+(h+(n-1)d)^p,$$
given complex numbers $h$ and $d \ne 0$. Faulhaber's formula handles the simple case $S_{1,1}^p(n) = {}$$\sum_{k=0}^{n-1}(1+k)^p={}$$1^p+2^p+\dots+n^p$. The polynomials $S_{1,2}^p(n)={}$$\sum_{k=0}^{n-1}(1+2k)^p={}$$1^p+3^p+\dots+(2n-1)^p$ compute sums of powers of successive odd numbers, and so on. In general, such polynomials exist for any arithmetic progression.

=== Matrix method ===
The general case is solved using the following matrix formula:
$$\vec{S_{h,d}}(n)=T(h,d)A^{-1}\vec{N_n},$$
with row-column definitions
$$\left[\vec{S_{h,d}}(n)\right]_{r}:=S_{h,d}^{r-1}(n),\quad \left[\vec{N_n}\right]_r:=n^{r},$$
$$[T(h,d)]_{r,c}:=\begin{cases}0 &\text{if } c>r\\
\binom{r-1}{c-1}h^{r-c}d^{c-1}&\text{if } c\leq r\end{cases}~, \quad
[A]_{r,c}:=\begin{cases} 0 &\text{if }c>r\\
\binom{r}{c-1} &\text{if }c\leq r\end{cases}~, \quad$$
where $r$ (row) and $c$ (column) are bound by a given matrix order $m$.

==== Example ====
To generalize up to $p = 4$, apply the above formula for matrix order $m = 5$:
$$\begin{pmatrix}
S_{h,d}^0({n})\\
S_{h,d}^1(n)\\
S_{h,d}^2(n)\\
S_{h,d}^3(n)\\
S_{h,d}^4(n)
\end{pmatrix}=
\begin{pmatrix}
1& 0& 0& 0&0\\
h& d& 0& 0&0\\
h^2& 2hd& d^2& 0&0\\
h^3& 3h^2d& 3hd^2& d^3&0\\
h^4& 4h^3d& 6h^2d^2& 4hd^3& d^4\\
\end{pmatrix}
\begin{pmatrix}
1& 0& 0& 0&0\\
1& 2& 0& 0&0\\
1& 3& 3& 0&0\\
1& 4& 6& 4&0\\
1& 5& 10& 10&5\\
\end{pmatrix}^{-1}
\begin{pmatrix}
n\\
n^2\\
n^3\\
n^4\\
n^5
\end{pmatrix}$$

Note that the nonzero elements of $T(h,d)$ follow the binomial theorem, and that $A$ is just Pascal's triangle with each row's last element omitted. Letting $h=1$, $d=2$ and computing $A^{-1}$, we have:
$$T(1,2)=\begin{pmatrix}
1& 0& 0& 0& 0\\
1& 2& 0& 0& 0 \\
1& 4& 4& 0& 0\\
1& 6& 12& 8& 0 \\
1& 8& 24& 32& 16 \\
\end{pmatrix},
\qquad
A^{-1}=\begin{pmatrix}
1 \color{black}&0 &0 &0 &0\\
-\frac{1}{2}\color{black}&\frac{1}{2}&0 &0 &0\\
\frac{1}{6}\color{black}&-\frac{1}{2}&\frac{1}{3} &0 &0\\
0\color{black}&\frac{1}{4}&-\frac{1}{2}&\frac{1}{4} &0\\
-\frac{1}{30}\color{black}&0&\frac{1}{3}&-\frac{1}{2}&\frac{1}{5}
\end{pmatrix}$$

Multiplication therefore yields
$$\begin{pmatrix}
S_{1,2}^0({n})\\
S_{1,2}^1({n})\\
S_{1,2}^2({n})\\
S_{1,2}^3({n})\\
S_{1,2}^4({n})
\end{pmatrix}=
\begin{pmatrix}
1 &0 &0 &0 &0\\
0&1&0 &0 &0 \\
-\frac{1}{3}&0&\frac{4}{3} &0 &0 \\
0&-1&0&2 &0 \\
\frac{7}{15}&0&-\frac{8}{3}&0&\frac{16}{5}
\end{pmatrix}
\begin{pmatrix}
n\\
n^2\\
n^3\\
n^4\\
n^5\\
\end{pmatrix}=\begin{pmatrix}
n\\
n^2\\
-\frac{1}{3}n+\frac{4}{3}n^3\\
-n^2+2n^4\\
\frac{7}{15}n-\frac{8}{3}n^3+\frac{16}{5}n^5\\
\end{pmatrix}.$$

=== Methods involving Bernoulli polynomials ===
The following formula implicitly solves the problem using Bernoulli polynomials:
$$S_{h,d}^p(n)=\frac{d^p}{p+1}\left(B_{p+1}\left(n+\frac{h}{d}\right)-B_{p+1}\left(\frac{h}{d}\right)\right)$$

In particular:
$$S_{1,1}^p(n)=\frac{B_{p+1}(n+1)-B_{p+1}(1)}{p+1}$$
$$S_{0,1}^p(n)=\frac{B_{p+1}(n)-B_{p+1}(0)}{p+1}$$
$$S_{1,2}^p(n)=2^p\frac{B_{p+1}\left(n+\frac{1}{2}\right)-B_{p+1}\left(\frac{1}{2}\right)}{p+1}$$

Furthermore, given the lower triangular matrix
$$[G(h,d)]_{r,c} := \begin{cases} 0 &\text{if }c>r \\
\frac{d^{r-1}}{r}\binom{r}{c}B_{r-c}\left(\frac{h}{d}\right) &\text{if }c\leq r\end{cases}~, \quad$$
one has the substitution $G(h,d) = T(h,d)A^{-1}$, allowing for a refinement of the above matrix method.

=== Faulhaber's formula in matrix form ===
Using the matrix method with $h=1,$ $d=1$, Faulhaber's formula may be written as a product of matrices derived from Pascal's triangle. Letting $S_{1,1}^p(n) = \sum{k^p}$, we have
$$\begin{pmatrix}
\sum k^0\\
\sum k^1\\
\sum k^2\\
\sum k^3\\
\sum k^4\\
\sum k^5\\
\sum k^6\\
\end{pmatrix} =
\begin{pmatrix}
1& 0& 0& 0& 0& 0& 0\\
1& 1& 0& 0& 0& 0& 0\\
1& 2& 1& 0& 0& 0& 0\\
1& 3& 3& 1& 0& 0& 0\\
1& 4& 6& 4& 1& 0& 0\\
1& 5& 10& 10& 5& 1& 0\\
1& 6& 15& 20& 15& 6& 1\\
\end{pmatrix}
\begin{pmatrix}
1& 0& 0& 0& 0& 0& 0\\
1& 2& 0& 0& 0& 0& 0\\
1& 3& 3& 0& 0& 0& 0\\
1& 4& 6& 4& 0& 0& 0\\
1& 5& 10& 10& 5& 0& 0\\
1& 6& 15& 20& 15& 6& 0\\
1& 7& 21& 35& 35& 21& 7\\
\end{pmatrix}^{-1}
\begin{pmatrix}
n\\
n^2\\
n^3\\
n^4\\
n^5\\
n^6\\
n^7\\
\end{pmatrix},$$
choosing $m=7$. This can be simplified given the surprising fact that
$$\begin{pmatrix}
1& 0& 0& 0& 0& 0& 0\\
-1& 2& 0& 0& 0& 0& 0\\
1& -3& 3& 0& 0& 0& 0\\
-1& 4& -6& 4& 0& 0& 0\\
1& -5& 10& -10& 5& 0& 0\\
-1& 6& -15& 20& -15& 6& 0\\
1& -7& 21& -35& 35& -21& 7\\
\end{pmatrix}
\begin{pmatrix}
1& 0& 0& 0& 0& 0& 0\\
1& 1& 0& 0& 0& 0& 0\\
1& 2& 1& 0& 0& 0& 0\\
1& 3& 3& 1& 0& 0& 0\\
1& 4& 6& 4& 1& 0& 0\\
1& 5& 10& 10& 5& 1& 0\\
1& 6& 15& 20& 15& 6& 1\\
\end{pmatrix} =
\begin{pmatrix}
1& 0& 0& 0& 0& 0& 0\\
1& 2& 0& 0& 0& 0& 0\\
1& 3& 3& 0& 0& 0& 0\\
1& 4& 6& 4& 0& 0& 0\\
1& 5& 10& 10& 5& 0& 0\\
1& 6& 15& 20& 15& 6& 0\\
1& 7& 21& 35& 35& 21& 7\\
\end{pmatrix}.$$

Let $\overline{A}$ be the leftmost matrix. Then $\overline{A}T(1,1) = A$, and so $T(1,1)A^{-1} = \overline{A}^{-1}$. Hence
$$\begin{pmatrix}
\sum k^0\\
\sum k^1\\
\sum k^2\\
\sum k^3\\
\sum k^4\\
\sum k^5\\
\sum k^6\\
\end{pmatrix} =
\begin{pmatrix}
1& 0& 0& 0& 0& 0& 0\\
-1& 2& 0& 0& 0& 0& 0\\
1& -3& 3& 0& 0& 0& 0\\
-1& 4& -6& 4& 0& 0& 0\\
1& -5& 10& -10& 5& 0& 0\\
-1& 6& -15& 20& -15& 6& 0\\
1& -7& 21& -35& 35& -21& 7\\
\end{pmatrix}^{-1}
\begin{pmatrix}
n\\
n^2\\
n^3\\
n^4\\
n^5\\
n^6\\
n^7\\
\end{pmatrix}$$
by substitution. Note the alternating signs in the inverted matrix. Since $T(0,1)$ is the identity matrix, the equation for the alternatively indexed power sums $\sum_{k=0}^{n-1}{k^p}$ follows readily:
$$\begin{pmatrix}
n\\
\sum_{k=0}^{n-1} k^1\\
\sum_{k=0}^{n-1} k^2\\
\sum_{k=0}^{n-1} k^3\\
\sum_{k=0}^{n-1} k^4\\
\sum_{k=0}^{n-1} k^5\\
\sum_{k=0}^{n-1} k^6\\
\end{pmatrix} =
\begin{pmatrix}
1& 0& 0& 0& 0& 0& 0\\
1& 2& 0& 0& 0& 0& 0\\
1& 3& 3& 0& 0& 0& 0\\
1& 4& 6& 4& 0& 0& 0\\
1& 5& 10& 10& 5& 0& 0\\
1& 6& 15& 20& 15& 6& 0\\
1& 7& 21& 35& 35& 21& 7\\
\end{pmatrix}^{-1}
\begin{pmatrix}
n\\
n^2\\
n^3\\
n^4\\
n^5\\
n^6\\
n^7\\
\end{pmatrix}$$

Since these matrix equations hold for every order, it is possible to obtain the polynomials of the sums of powers of successive integers without resorting to the numbers of Bernoulli but by inverting a matrix easily obtained from the triangle of Pascal.

== Faulhaber polynomials ==
The term Faulhaber polynomials is used by some authors to refer to another polynomial sequence related to that given above.

Write
$$a = \sum_{k=1}^n k = \frac{n(n+1)}{2} .$$
Faulhaber observed that if $p$ is odd then $\sum_{k=1}^n k^p$ is a polynomial function of $a$.

Proof without words for p = 3

For $p = 1$, it is clear that
$$\sum_{k=1}^n k^1 = \sum_{k=1}^n k = \frac{n(n+1)}{2} = a.$$
For $p = 3$, the result that
$$\sum_{k=1}^n k^3 = \frac{n^2(n+1)^2}{4} = a^2$$
is known as Nicomachus's theorem.

Further, we have
$$\begin{align}
\sum_{k=1}^n k^5 &= \frac{4a^3 - a^2}{3} \\
\sum_{k=1}^n k^7 &= \frac{6a^4 -4a^3 + a^2}{3} \\
\sum_{k=1}^n k^9 &= \frac{16a^5 - 20a^4 +12a^3 - 3a^2}{5} \\
\sum_{k=1}^n k^{11} &= \frac{16a^6 - 32a^5 + 34a^4 - 20a^3 + 5a^2}{3}
\end{align}$$
(see OEIS: A000537, OEIS: A000539, OEIS: A000541, OEIS: A007487, OEIS: A123095).

More generally,
$$\sum_{k=1}^n k^{2m+1} = \frac{1}{2^{2m+2}(2m+2)} \sum_{q=0}^m \binom{2m+2}{2q}
\left(2-2^{2q}\right)~ B_{2q} ~\left[(8a+1)^{m+1-q}-1\right].$$

Some authors call the polynomials in $a$ on the right-hand sides of these identities Faulhaber polynomials. These polynomials are divisible by $a^2$ because the Bernoulli number $B_j$ is 0 for odd $j > 1$.

Inversely, writing for simplicity $S_m: = \sum_{k=1}^n k^m$, we have
$$\begin{align}
4a^3 &= 3S_5 + S_3 \\
8a^4 &= 4S_7 + 4S_5 \\
16a^5 &= 5S_9 + 10S_7 + S_5
\end{align}$$
and generally
$$2^{m-1} a^m = \sum_{j>0} \binom{m}{2j-1} S_{2m-2j+1}.$$

Faulhaber also knew that if a sum for an odd power is given by
$$\sum_{k=1}^n k^{2m+1} = c_1 a^2 + c_2 a^3 + \cdots + c_m a^{m+1}$$
then the sum for the even power just below is given by
$$\sum_{k=1}^n k^{2m} = \frac{n+\frac12}{2m+1} \left(2 c_1 a + 3 c_2 a^2+\cdots + (m+1) c_m a^m\right).$$
Note that the polynomial in parentheses is the derivative of the polynomial above with respect to $a$.

Since $a = n(n + 1)/2$, these formulae show that for an odd power (greater than 1), the sum is a polynomial in $n$ having factors $n^2$ and $(n + 1)^2$, while for an even power the polynomial has factors $n$, $n + 1/2$ and $n + 1$.

== Expressing products of power sums as linear combinations of power sums ==
Products of two (and thus by iteration, several) power sums $S_m:=\sum_{k=1}^n k^m$ with $m \geq 1$ can be written as linear combinations of power sums with either all degrees even or all degrees odd, depending on the parity of the total degree of the product as a polynomial in $n$, e.g. $30 S_2S_4=-S_3+15S_5+16S_7$. The sums of coefficients on both sides must be equal, which follows by letting $n = 1$. Some general formulae include:
$$\begin{align}
S_pS_q = \frac{1}{p+1}\sum_{j=0}^{\left\lfloor\frac{p}{2}\right\rfloor}&{\binom{p+1}{2j}B_{2j}S_{p+q+1-2j}} + \frac{1}{q+1}\sum_{j=0}^{\left\lfloor\frac{q}{2}\right\rfloor}{\binom{q+1}{2j}B_{2j}S_{p+q+1-2j}}.\\
S_m^{\;2} &= \frac{2}{m+1}\sum_{j=0}^{\left\lfloor\frac{m}2\right\rfloor}\binom{m+1}{2j}B_{2j}S_{2m+1-2j}.\\
S_mS_{m-1} = B_mS_m &+ \frac{1}{m(m+1)}\!\!\sum_{j=0}^{\left\lfloor\frac{m-1}2\right\rfloor}\!\!\binom{m+1}{2j}(2m+1-2j)B_{2j}S_{2m-2j}.\\
S_1^{\;m} &= \frac{1}{2^{m-1}}\!\!\sum_{j=1}^{\left\lfloor\frac{m+1}2\right\rfloor}\!\!\binom{m}{2j-1} S_{2m+1-2j}.\end{align}$$
The latter formula may be used to recursively compute Faulhaber polynomials. Note that in the third formula, the quantity $B_mS_m$ vanishes for odd $m \geq 3$ since $B_m=0$. Beardon has published formulas for powers of $S_m$, including a 1996 paper which demonstrated that positive-integer powers of $S_1$ can be expressed as linear combinations of the even-degree power sums $S_1, S_3, S_5, \ldots$:
$$S_1^{\;N} = \frac{1}{2^N}\sum_{k=0}^{N-1}{N \choose k}{\left(1-(-1)^{N+k}\right)S_{N+k}}$$

The first few resulting identities are then
$$S_1^{\;2} = S_3$$
$$S_1^{\;3} = \frac{1}{4}S_3 + \frac{3}{4}S_5$$
$$S_1^{\;4} = \frac{1}{2}S_5 + \frac{1}{2}S_7 .$$

Although other specific cases of $S_m^{\;N}$ – including $S_2^{\;2} = \frac{1}{3}S_3 + \frac{2}{3}S_5$ and $S_2^{\;3} = \frac{1}{12}S_4 + \frac{7}{12}S_6+ \frac{1}{3}S_8$ – are known, no explicit formula for $S_m^{\;N}$ for positive integers $m$ and $N$ has yet been reported.

Kariya showed that
$$(S_m(n))^2 = \sum_{j=1}^{n}{\left(2j^mS_m(j) - j^{2m}\right)}$$
which was generalized to arbitrary positive-integer powers by Derby:
$$(S_m(n))^N = \sum_{k=1}^{N}(-1)^{k-1} {N \choose k}\sum_{j=1}^{n}j^{km}(S_m(j))^{N-k}.$$

The $m = 1$ case replicates Beardon's formula for $S_1^{\;N}$ and confirms the above-stated results for $m = 2$ and $N = 2$ or $3$. Results for higher powers include:
$$S_2^{\;4} = \frac{1}{54}S_5 + \frac{5}{18}S_7 + \frac{5}{9}S_9 + \frac{4}{27}S_{11}$$
$$S_6^{\;3} = \frac{1}{588}S_8 - \frac{1}{42}S_{10} + \frac{13}{84}S_{12} - \frac{47}{98}S_{14} + \frac{17}{28}S_{16} + \frac{19}{28}S_{18} + \frac{3}{49}S_{20}$$
$$S_7^{\;3} = \frac{1}{48}S_{11} - \frac{7}{48}S_{13} + \frac{35}{64}S_{15} - \frac{23}{24}S_{17} + \frac{77}{96}S_{19} + \frac{11}{16}S_{21} + \frac{3}{64}S_{23}.$$

Further generalization is possible by considering the arbitrary power-sum product $P := S_{m_1}S_{m_2}S_{m_3} \cdots S_{m_r}$ given positive integers $m_1, \ldots, m_r$. For convenience define $q := \sum_{k=1}^r{m_k}$, and let $p_r, \ldots, p_{q+r}$ be the (possibly nonzero) coefficients of the polynomial $P$ — i.e. $P(n) = \sum_{k=r}^{q+r}{p_kn^k}$. It can be shown that
$$\prod_{k=1}^r{S_{m_k}} = \!\sum_{k=r}^{q+r-1}\!{\left(1-(-1)^{q+r+k}\right)p_kS_k}.$$

In particular, the product $S_1^{\;r}$ has trivially retrievable coefficients:
$$(S_1(n))^r = \left(\frac{n(n+1)}{2}\right)^r = \sum_{k=r}^{2r}{\frac{1}{2^r}\binom{r}{k-r}n^k}.$$

Combining with the above gives
$$S_1^{\;r} = \frac{1}{2^r}\sum_{k=r}^{2r-1}{\left(1-(-1)^k\right)\binom{r}{k-r}S_k}$$
which is an indexical restatement of Beardon's formula. More generally,
$$S_m^{\;r} = \!\!\!\sum_{k=r}^{r(m+1)-1}\!\!\!{\left(1-(-1)^{r(m+1)+k}\right)p_kS_k}.$$

Compared to Derby's approach, this formula only requires knowledge of the coefficients of $S_m^{\;r}$.

== Recurrence relation between sums of powers ==
Extending the Faulhaber's formula as a polynomial over the reals denoted by $S_m(x)$, it satisfies the first-order recurrence relation
$$S_m'(x) = m S_{m-1}(x) + B_m^+.$$

The polynomial $S'_m$ is the derivative of $S_m$ with respect to $x$, and the constants $B_m^+$ are again the second Bernoulli numbers. This recurrence relation can be integrated to yield sums of higher powers:
$$S_m(x) = m \int_{0}^{x} S_{m-1}(t)\,\mathrm{d}t + B_m^+ x.$$

These results can be seen as corollaries to the integral recurrence of the Bernoulli polynomials. This recurrence relation is easy to remember as it is much akin to the derivatives of polynomials: $(k^m)' = m k^{m-1}$ with an addition of the second Bernoulli numbers.

=== Calculated examples ===
The first four calculated examples are as shown below: since
$$S_0(x) = x,$$
we have
$$S_1(x) = \int_0^x t \,\mathrm{d}t + B^+_1x = \frac{x^2}{2} + \frac{x}{2}$$
$$S_2(x) = 2\int_0^x \left(\frac{t^2}{2} + \frac{t}{2}\right) \mathrm{d}t + B^+_2x = \frac{x^3}{3} + \frac{x^2}{2} + \frac{x}{6}$$
$$S_3(x) = 3\int_0^x \left(\frac{t^3}{3} + \frac{t^2}{2} + \frac{t}{6}\right) \mathrm{d}t + B^+_3x = \frac{x^4}{4} + \frac{x^3}{2} + \frac{x^2}{4}$$
$$S_4(x) = 4\int_0^x \left(\frac{t^4}{4} + \frac{t^3}{2} + \frac{t^2}{4}\right) \mathrm{d}t + B^+_4x = \frac{x^5}{5} + \frac{x^4}{2} + \frac{x^3}{3} - \frac{x}{30}.$$

In practice, when deriving $S_m(x)$ from $S_{m-1}(x)$, one can simply determine $B_m^+$ by noting that $S_m(1) = 1$.

=== Proof ===
We know that $S_m(x)$ is a polynomial. Since it coincides with the power sum at integer values, its extension to the reals should satisfy
$$S_m(x) - S_m(x-1) = x^m.$$

Similarly, we have
$$S_{m-1}(x) - S_{m-1}(x-1) = x^{m-1}.$$

Note that the latter is a multiple of $m$ away from the derivative of the former. Defining the residual $P_m(x) = S'_m(x) - mS_{m-1}(x)$, we have
$$\begin{aligned}
P_m(x) - P_m(x-1) &= \left(S'_{m}(x) - mS_{m-1}(x)\right) - \left(S'_{m}(x-1) - mS_{m-1}(x-1)\right) \\
&= \left(S'_{m}(x) - S'_{m}(x-1)\right) - m\left(S_{m-1}(x) - S_{m-1}(x-1)\right) \\
&= m x^{m-1} - m x^{m-1} \\
&= 0.
\end{aligned}$$

I.e., $P_m$ is 1-periodic. By restricting the residual to be a polynomial, it must be a constant depending on $m$. Thus, the recurrence relation is obtained.

== Variations ==
- Replacing $k$ with $p-k$, we find the alternative expression:
  $$\sum_{k=1}^n k^p= \sum_{k=0}^p \frac1{k+1}{p \choose k} B_{p-k} n^{k+1}.$$
- Subtracting $n^p$ from both sides of the original formula and incrementing $n$ by $1$, we get
  $$\begin{align}
\sum_{k=1}^n k^{p} &= \frac{1}{p+1} \sum_{k=0}^p \binom{p+1}{k} (-1)^kB_k (n+1)^{p-k+1} \\
&=  \sum_{k=0}^p \frac{1}{k+1} \binom{p}{k} (-1)^{p-k}B_{p-k} (n+1)^{k+1},
\end{align}$$
  where $(-1)^kB_k = B^-_k$ can be interpreted as "negative" Bernoulli numbers with $B^-_1=-\tfrac12$.
- We may also expand $G(z,n)$ in terms of the Bernoulli polynomials to find
  $$\begin{align}
G(z,n) &= \frac{e^{(n+1)z}}{e^z -1} - \frac{e^z}{e^z -1}\\
&= \sum_{j=0}^{\infty} \left(B_j(n+1)-(-1)^j B_j\right) \frac{z^{j-1}}{j!},
\end{align}$$
  which implies
  $$\sum_{k=1}^n k^p = \frac{1}{p+1} \left(B_{p+1}(n+1)-(-1)^{p+1}B_{p+1}\right) = \frac{1}{p+1}\left(B_{p+1}(n+1)-B_{p+1}(1) \right).$$
  Since $B_n = 0$ whenever $n > 1$ is odd, the factor $(-1)^{p+1}$ may be removed when $p > 0$.
- It can also be expressed in terms of Stirling numbers of the second kind and falling factorials as
  $$\sum_{k=0}^n k^p = \sum_{k=0}^p \left\{{p\atop k}\right\}\frac{(n+1)_{k+1}}{k+1},$$
  $$\sum_{k=1}^n k^p = \sum_{k=1}^{p+1} \left\{{p+1\atop k}\right\}\frac{(n)_k}{k}.$$
  This is due to the definition of the Stirling numbers of the second kind as monomials in terms of falling factorials, and the behaviour of falling factorials under the indefinite sum.
  Interpreting the Stirling numbers of the second kind, $\left\{{p+1\atop k}\right\}$, as the number of set partitions of $\lbrack p+1\rbrack$ into $k$ parts, the identity has a direct combinatorial proof since both sides count the number of functions $f:\lbrack p+1\rbrack \to \lbrack n\rbrack$ with $f(1)$ maximal. The index of summation on the left hand side represents $k=f(1)$, while the index on the right hand side represents the number of elements in the image of $f$.
- There is also a similar (but somehow simpler) expression: using the idea of telescoping and the binomial theorem, one gets Pascal's identity:
  $$\begin{align}(n+1)^{k+1}-1  &= \sum_{m = 1}^n \left((m+1)^{k+1} - m^{k+1}\right)\\
&= \sum_{p = 0}^k \binom{k+1}{p} (1^p+2^p+ \dots + n^p).\end{align}$$
  This in particular yields the examples below – e.g., take k = 1 to get the first example. In a similar fashion we also find
  $$\begin{align}n^{k+1}   = \sum_{m = 1}^n \left(m^{k+1} - (m-1)^{k+1}\right) = \sum_{p = 0}^k (-1)^{k+p}\binom{k+1}{p} (1^p+2^p+ \dots + n^p).\end{align}$$
- A generalized expression involving the Eulerian numbers $A_n(x)$ is
  $$\sum_{n=1}^\infty n^k x^n=\frac{x}{(1-x)^{k+1}}A_k(x).$$
- Faulhaber's formula was generalized by Guo and Zeng to a q-analog.

== Relationship to Riemann zeta function ==
Using $B_k=-k\zeta(1-k)$, one can write
$$\sum\limits_{k=1}^n k^p = \frac{n^{p+1}}{p+1} - \sum\limits_{j=0}^{p-1}{p \choose j}\zeta(-j)n^{p-j}.$$

If we consider the generating function $G(z,n)$ in the large $n$ limit for $\Re (z)<0$, then we find
$$\lim_{n\rightarrow \infty}G(z,n) = \frac{1}{e^{-z}-1}=\sum_{j=0}^{\infty} (-1)^{j-1}B_j \frac{z^{j-1}}{j!}$$
Heuristically, this suggests that
$$\sum_{k=1}^{\infty} k^p=\frac{(-1)^{p} B_{p+1}}{p+1}.$$
This result agrees with the value of the Riemann zeta function $\zeta(s)=\sum_{n=1}^{\infty}\frac{1}{n^s}$ for negative integers $s=-p<0$ on appropriately analytically continuing $\zeta(s)$.

Faulhaber's formula can be written in terms of the Hurwitz zeta function:
$$\sum\limits_{k=1}^n k^p = \zeta(-p) - \zeta(-p, n+1)$$

== Umbral form ==
In the umbral calculus, one treats the Bernoulli numbers $B^0 = 1$, $B^1 = \frac{1}{2}$, $B^2 = \frac{1}{6}$, ... as if the index $j$ in $B^j$ were actually an exponent, and so as if the Bernoulli numbers were powers of some object B.

Using this notation, Faulhaber's formula can be written as
$$\sum_{k=1}^n k^p = \frac{1}{p+1} \big( (B+n)^{p+1} - B^{p+1} \big) .$$
Here, the expression on the right must be understood by expanding out to get terms $B^j$ that can then be interpreted as the Bernoulli numbers. Specifically, using the binomial theorem, we get
$$\begin{align}
\frac{1}{p+1} \big( (B+n)^{p+1} - B^{p+1} \big)
&= {1 \over p+1} \left( \sum_{k=0}^{p+1} \binom{p+1}{k} B^k n^{p+1-k} - B^{p+1} \right)  \\
&= {1 \over p+1} \sum_{k=0}^{p} \binom{p+1}{j} B^k n^{p+1-k} .
\end{align}$$

A derivation of Faulhaber's formula using the umbral form is available in The Book of Numbers by John Horton Conway and Richard K. Guy.

Classically, this umbral form was considered as a notational convenience. In the modern umbral calculus, on the other hand, this is given a formal mathematical underpinning. One considers the linear functional $T$ on the vector space of polynomials in a variable $b$ given by $T(b^j) = B_j.$ Then one can say
$$\begin{align}
\sum_{k=1}^n k^p &= {1 \over p+1} \sum_{j=0}^p {p+1 \choose j} B_j n^{p+1-j} \\
&= {1 \over p+1} \sum_{j=0}^p {p+1 \choose j} T(b^j) n^{p+1-j} \\
&= {1 \over p+1} T\left(\sum_{j=0}^p {p+1 \choose j} b^j n^{p+1-j} \right) \\
&= T\left({(b+n)^{p+1} - b^{p+1} \over p+1}\right).
\end{align}$$
