= Mazur's theorem =

Mazur's theorem may refer to:

- Ascoli–Mazur theorem, or Mazur's theorem, a corollary of the Hahn–Banach separation theorem in functional analysis
- Mazur's torsion theorem, a proof of the torsion conjecture for elliptic curves over the rationals
- Mazur's control theorem, in number theory

== See also ==
- Mazur's Conjecture B, a weaker variant of the uniform boundedness conjecture
- Mazur's lemma, a result in the theory of normed vector spaces
