= Susan Marshall =

Susan Marshall may refer to:

- Susan Marshall (musician) (born c. 1964), American singer and songwriter
- Susan Marshall (choreographer) (born 1958), American choreographer
- Susan H. Marshall, American mathematician
- Susan Marshall McDonald (1918–1992), American philatelist and philatelic author
