= C/1618 W1 =

Great Comet of 1618

C/1618 W1 (Great Comet of 1618)
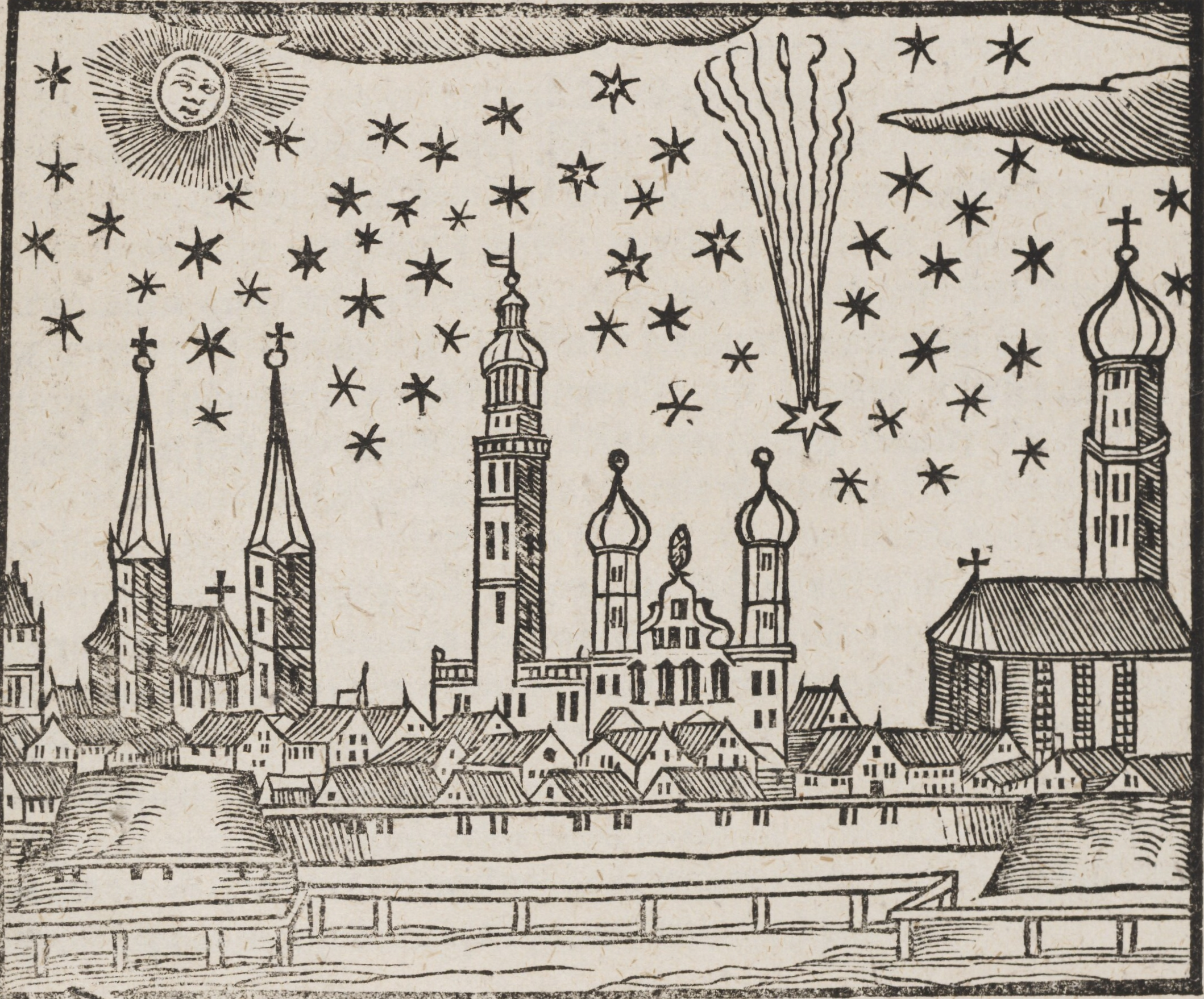
- The Great Comet of 1618 over Augsburg, Germany

Discovery
- Discovery date: 25 November 1618

Designations
- Alternative designations: 1618 II

Orbital characteristics
- Epoch: 8 November 1618 (JD 2312334.351)
- Observation arc: 53 days
- Number of observations: 42
- Perihelion: 0.38954 AU
- Eccentricity: ~1.000
- Max. orbital speed: ~67 km/s
- Inclination: 37.196°
- Longitude of ascending node: 81.001°
- Argument of periapsis: 287.436°
- Last perihelion: 8 November 1618

Physical characteristics
- Apparent magnitude: 0–1 (1618 apparition)

C/1618 W1 is a comet that was visible to the naked eye in 1618 and 1619. It is classified as a "Great Comet" due to its extraordinary brightness and its long tail, measuring up to 90° long.

It was the first comet to be observed with telescopes (along with two smaller ones in the same year). While leading scientists at the time made precise observations, others discussed at a colloquium whether these comets were divine signs because of the war that had just broken out across Europe, or purely natural phenomena.

== Discovery and observation ==
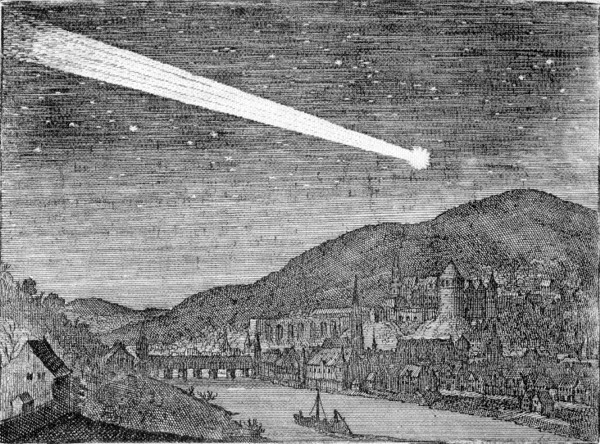
The Great Comet of 1618 over Heidelberg, Germany

Three comets were visible in the naked eye in 1618. The brightest of these is probably the one first observed on 25 November. Two Chinese texts reported the sighting of the comet on the morning of 26 November, with its tail measuring 10° long across the sky, pointed to the southeast.

It is possible that the comet was discovered earlier in Persia, where the Spanish ambassador García de Silva y Figueroa had seen it in Isfahan a day or two earlier. However, his reports are inaccurate in this regard. He described it as diffuse and of the color and brightness of Venus in the eastern sky. Sightings were also made in Korea, the Moluccas, and the Philippines.

The comet reached a brightness of 0–1 mag on 29 November. In Europe, the comet was observed by many astronomers from the end of November. Johannes Kepler saw it in Linz on the morning of 29 November and was able to measure its orbit until 7 January. The Swiss Jesuit Johann Baptist Cysat observed the comet from Ingolstadt from 1 December. On December 9, he reported a tail length of 70°. In England, the astronomer John Bainbridge observed it from 28 November to 26 December and drew maps showing the comet's position in the sky. From his observations, he concluded that the comet was ten times further away from the Earth than the Moon.

Longomontanus, a student of Tycho Brahe, reported the comet's tail stretching 104° across the sky on 10 December while the Jesuit Orazio Grassi estimated a tail length of about 60° on 12 December in Rome. Other astronomers, such as Pierre Gassendi, Wilhelm Schickard, and Willebrord Snellius also made observations of the comet.

The comet could be observed in China until 4 January 1619. Its last sighting was by Cysat on the morning of 22 January with a telescope.

== Superstition ==
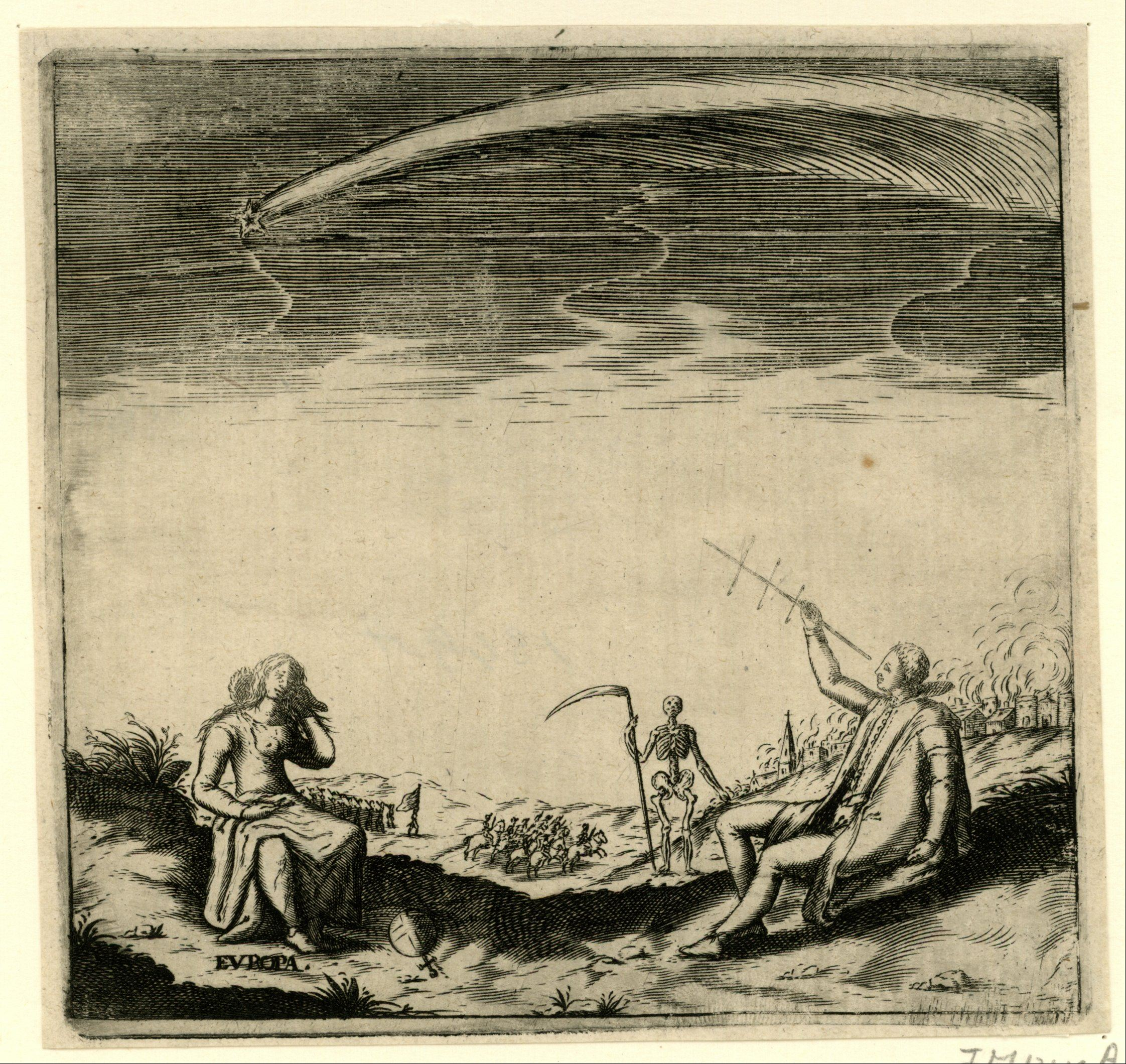
The Great Comet being depicted as the harbinger of war and death in a Dutch pamphlet (1619)

As was common at the time, this comet was also seen in a flood of writings as an ominous harbinger of various misfortunes and as a warning and "rod of wrath" sent by God. One Thuringian chronicle stated:

On November 3, 1618, a terrible comet appeared in the sky, which was visible for the next month and even into the following year; for after it war, rebellion, bloodshed, pestilence, famine and unspeakable misfortune followed all over the world. No terrible comet is seen that does not bring great misfortune with it...

— Volkmar Happe, "Part I, f. 24v", Chronicon Thuringiae (1619)

In retrospect, by 1630 the comet was seen as a harbinger of the Thirty Years' War. In addition, the near-consecutive deaths of Archduke Maximilian III, Pope Paul V, and King Philip III of Spain were speculated to have been "announced" by the comet's 1618 appearance as well.

== Scientific evaluation ==
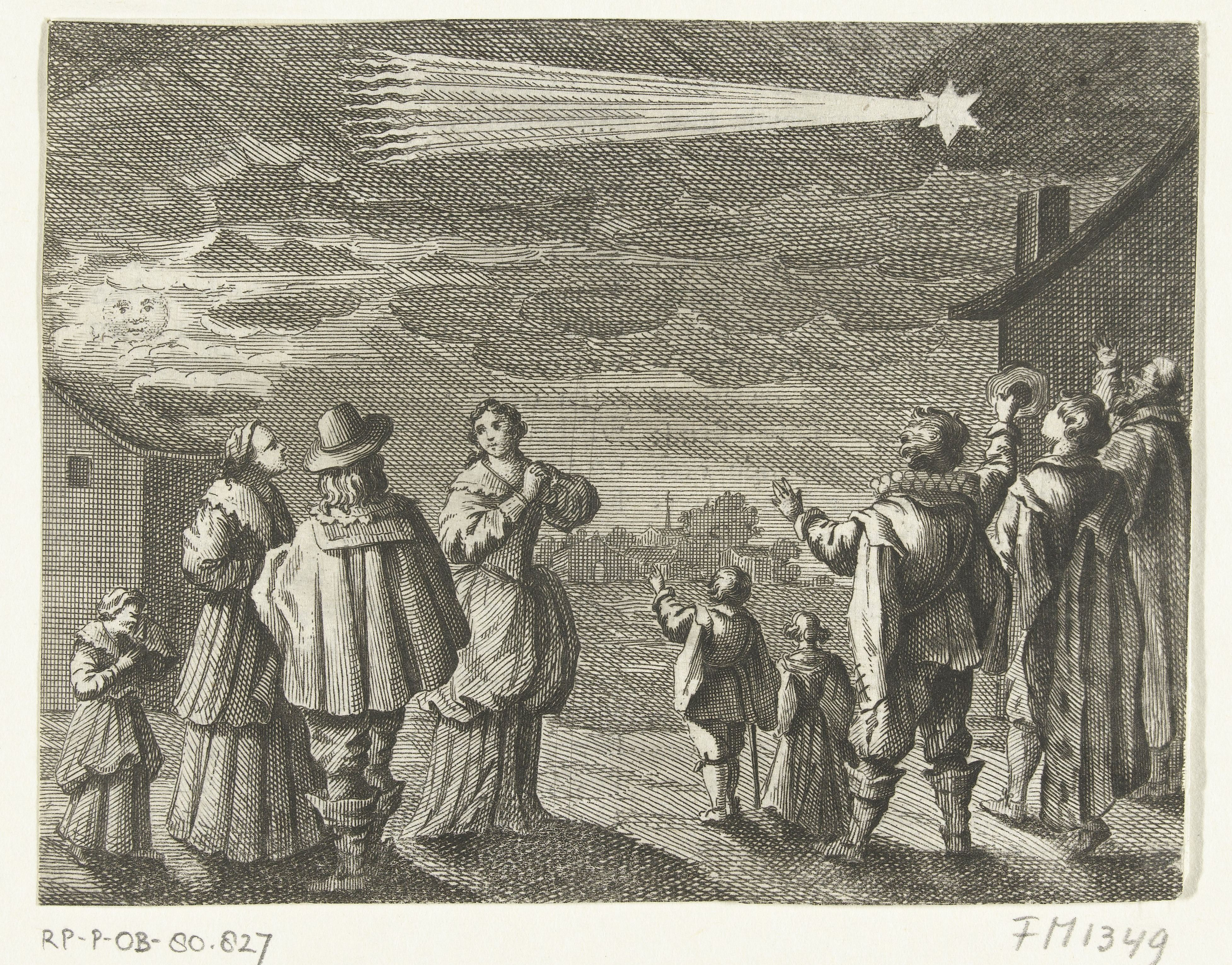
The Great Comet of 1618 over the Netherlands

The comets of 1618 were the first to be observed with such instruments after the invention of the telescope. In addition to more precise observation of their appearance, this also enabled much more precise measurement of their positions in the sky, which would later facilitate the calculation of orbital elements.

Johannes Kepler published his findings on the three comets in his 1619 book, De Cometis libelli tres, which he built on the previous study by Tycho Brahe and Michael Mästlin, where the two astronomers had successfully measured the parallax of the Great Comet of 1577 about 41 years prior. They were thus able to prove that comets were not structures in the Earth's atmosphere, but are real celestial bodies that moved in elliptical orbits around the Sun. Kepler defended his assumption of rectilinear cometary motion. Like his predecessors, he attributed the formation of comets to condensations in the now-discredited concept of luminiferous ether.

=== Ulm comet dispute of 1619 ===
In 1619, a dispute broke out in Ulm, Germany between theologians and natural scientists (led by Johann Faulhaber and Michael Maestlin) which concerned the question of whether the comets that appeared in the sky of 1618 were signs sent by God as punishment for the outbreak of the Thirty Years' War, or just simply natural phenomena with no influence on historical events. A colloquium was then held on 18 October to clarify these issues, of which several scientists (including René Descartes) participated.

== Orbit ==
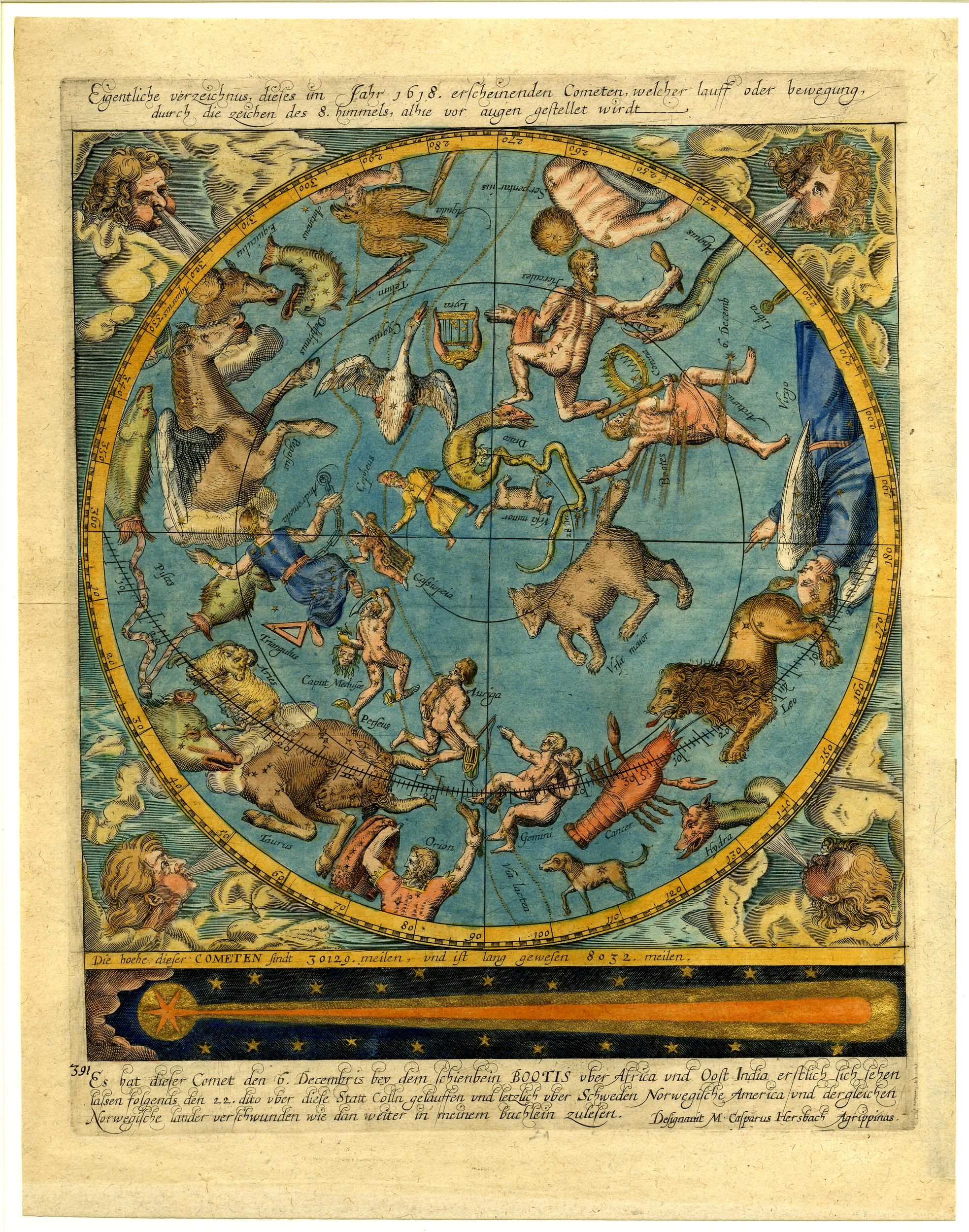
A celestial map from 1618, showing the Comet's position superimposed on the constellation Boötes

From 42 observations over 53 days, Friedrich Wilhelm Bessel was able to determine a rough parabolic orbit for the comet, which is inclined by 37° to the ecliptic, thus its orbit is inclined to the orbital planes of the planets. By 19 October, it had already come as close as about 61 million km (0.41 AU) to Venus, and by 30 October, it had approached Jupiter to within about 4.67 AU. The comet reached perihelion on 8 November 1618, which is about 58.3 million km (36.2 million mi) from the Sun. On 6 December, it passed the Earth at a distance of about 54 million km (0.36 AU). There were no other notable approaches with the other planets.

Due to the uncertainty of the initial orbital data, it is not known whether the comet could return to the inner Solar System sometime in the future or it was ejected towards interstellar space.

== In literature ==
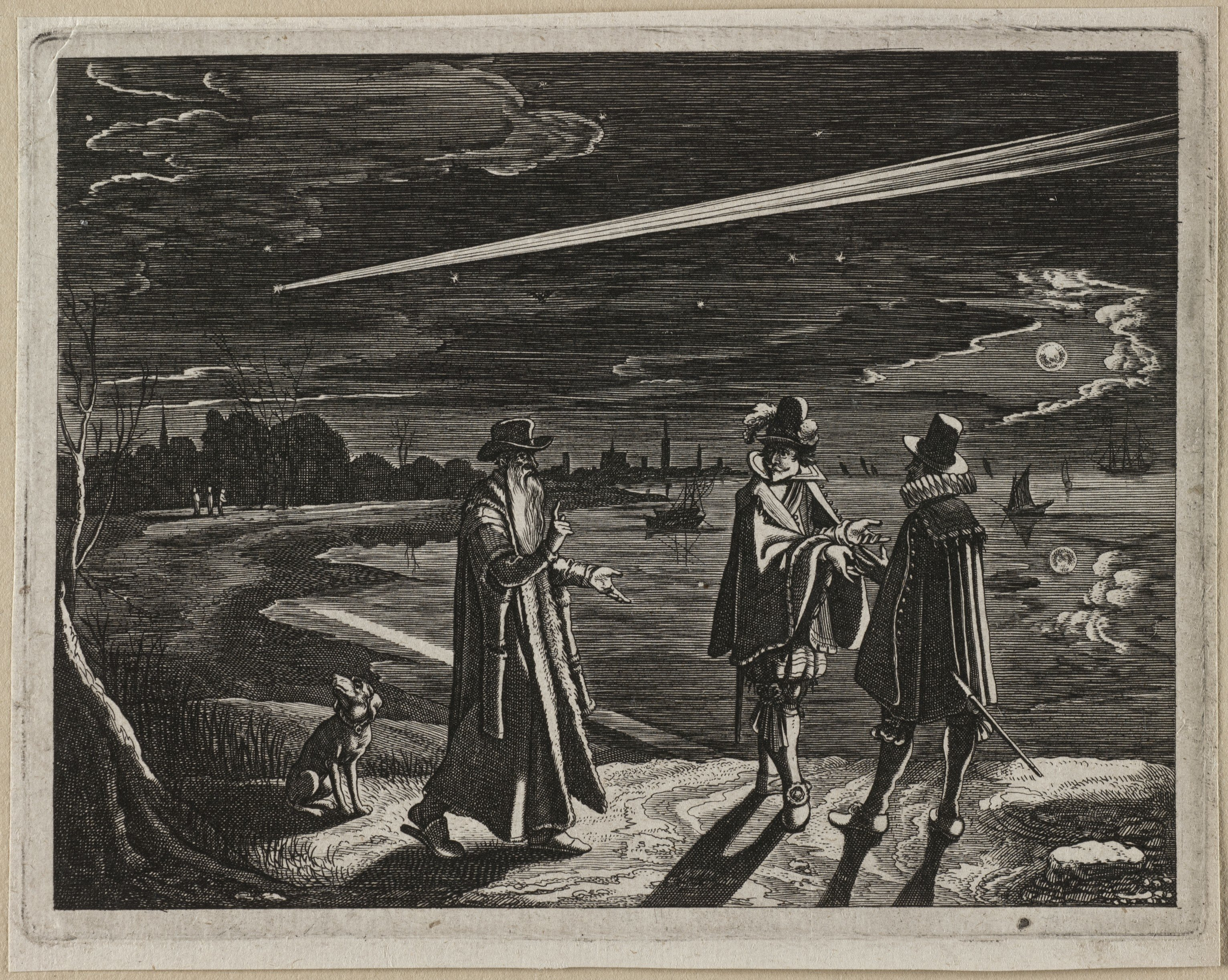
The Comet as depicted in the Aenmerckinge (1619) by Adriaen van de Venne

The Great Comet of 1618 had also sparked wild speculation in England about its possible ill-fated significance. Some saw it as divine disapproval of King James I's efforts to form a marriage alliance with Spain. The English king was concerned about the political implications of this speculation and wrote a poem alluding to the people's credulity:

You men of Britaine, wherefore gaze yee so
Uppon an Angry starr, whenh as yee know
The sun shall turne to darknesse, the Moon to blood
And then twill be to late for to turne good
O be so happy then while time doth last
As to remember Dooms day is not past
And misinterpret not, with vaine Conceit
The Caracter you see on Heaven gate.
Which though it bring the world some news from fate
The letters such as no man can translate
And for to guesse at God Almightys minde
Where such a thing might Cozen all mankinde
Wherfore I wish the Curious man to keep
His rash Imaginations till he sleepe
Then let him dreame of Famine plague & war
And thinke the match with spaine hath causd this star
Or let them thinke that if their Prince my Minion
Will shortly chang, or which is worse religion
And that he may have nothing elce to feare
Let him walke Pauls, and meet the Devills there
And if he be a Puritan, and scapes
Jesuites, salute them in their proper shapes
These Jealousys I would not have a Treason
In him whose Fancy overrules his Reason
Yet to be sure It did no harme, Twere fit
He would be bold to pray for no more witt
But onely to Conceale his dreame, for there
Be those that will believe what he dares feare

— King James I, "On the Blazeing Starr", Of Prophecy and Portent (c. 1618–1623)

== See also ==
- Great comet
  - C/1577 V1
  - C/1680 V1
