= Imagining Numbers =

Book by Barry Mazur

- Hardcover edition
- Author: Barry Mazur
- Language: English
- Publisher: Farrar, Straus and Giroux
- Publication date: January 1, 2003
- Publication place: United States
- Media type: Print
- Pages: 270 pp.
- ISBN: 978-0374174699

Imagining Numbers: (particularly the square root of minus fifteen) is a 2003 popular mathematics book by mathematician Barry Mazur. The aim of the book is not a history of imaginary numbers, but an attempt to:

re-create, in ourselves, the shift of mathematical thought that makes it possible to imagine these numbers.

The book was published by Farrar, Straus and Giroux.
