= Eilenberg–Mazur swindle =

Method of proof involving paradoxical properties of infinite sums

In mathematics, the Eilenberg–Mazur swindle, named after Samuel Eilenberg and Barry Mazur, is a method of proof that involves paradoxical properties of infinite sums. In geometric topology, it was introduced by Mazur and is often called the Mazur swindle. In algebra, it was introduced by Samuel Eilenberg and is known as the Eilenberg swindle or Eilenberg telescope (see telescoping sum).

The Eilenberg–Mazur swindle is similar to the following well known joke "proof" that 1 = 0:

1 = 1 + (−1 + 1) + (−1 + 1) + ... = 1 − 1 + 1 − 1 + ... = (1 − 1) + (1 − 1) + ... = 0

This "proof" is not valid as a claim about real numbers because Grandi's series 1 − 1 + 1 − 1 + ... does not converge, but the analogous argument can be used in some contexts where there is some sort of "addition" defined on some objects for which infinite sums do make sense, to show that if $A+B=0$ then $A=B=0$.

== Mazur swindle ==
In geometric topology, the addition used in the swindle is usually the connected sum of knots or manifolds.

A typical application of the Mazur swindle is the proof that the sum of two non-trivial knots $A$ and $B$ is non-trivial. For knots it is possible to take infinite sums by making the knots smaller and smaller, so if $A+B$ is trivial then

$$A=A+(B+A)+(B+A)+\cdots = (A+B)+(A+B)+\cdots=0$$

so $A$ is trivial (and $B$ by an analogous argument). The infinite sum of knots is usually a wild knot, not a tame knot. There are many geometric examples of the swindle.

Oriented $n$-manifolds have an addition operation given by connected sum, with identity the $n$-sphere. If $A+B$ is the $n$-sphere, then $A+B+A+B+\cdots$ is Euclidean space, so the Mazur swindle shows that the connected sum of $A$ and Euclidean space is again Euclidean space. Hence $A$ is the one-point compactification of Euclidean space and therefore $A$ is homeomorphic to the $n$-sphere. (This does not show in the case of smooth manifolds that $A$ is diffeomorphic to the $n$-sphere, and in some dimensions, such as $7$, there are examples of exotic spheres $A$ with inverses that are not diffeomorphic to the standard $n$-sphere.)

== Eilenberg swindle ==
In algebra the addition used in the swindle is usually the direct sum of modules over a ring.

A typical application of the Eilenberg swindle in algebra is the proof that if $A$ is a projective module over a ring $R$ then there is a free module $F$ with $A\oplus F\cong F$. To see this, choose a module $B$ such that $A\oplus B$ is free, which can be done as $A$ is projective, and put

$$F=B\oplus A\oplus B\oplus A\oplus B\oplus\cdots$$

so that

$$A\oplus F =A\oplus (B\oplus A)\oplus (B\oplus A)\oplus \cdots = (A\oplus B) \oplus (A\oplus B) \oplus \cdots \cong F.$$

For another application of the swindle, recall that finitely-generated free modules over commutative rings have a well-defined natural number as their dimension which is additive under direct sums, and are isomorphic if and only if they have the same dimension.

This is false for some noncommutative rings, and a counterexample can be constructed using the Eilenberg swindle as follows: let $X$ be an abelian group such that $X\cong X\oplus X$ (for example the direct sum of an infinite number of copies of any nonzero abelian group), and let $R$ be the ring of endomorphisms of $X$. Then the left $R$-module $R$ is isomorphic to the left $R$-module $R\oplus R$.

As a final interesting example, if $A$ and $B$ are any groups then the Eilenberg swindle can be used to construct a ring $R$ such that the group rings $R[A]$ and $R[B]$ are isomorphic rings: take $R$ to be the group ring of the restricted direct product of infinitely many copies of $A\times B$.

== Other examples ==
The proof of the Schröder-Bernstein theorem might be seen as antecedent of the Eilenberg–Mazur swindle. In fact, the ideas are quite similar. If there are injections of sets from X to Y and from Y to X, this means that formally we have X = Y + A and Y = X + B for some sets A and B, where + means disjoint union and = means there is a bijection between two sets. Expanding the former with the latter,

X = X + A + B.

In this bijection, let Z consist of those elements of the left hand side that correspond to an element of X on the right hand side. This bijection then expands to the bijection

X = A + B + A + B + ⋯ + Z.

Substituting the right hand side for X in Y = B + X gives the bijection

Y = B + A + B + A + ⋯ + Z.

Switching every adjacent pair B + A yields

Y = A + B + A + B + ⋯ + Z.

Composing the bijection for X with the inverse of the bijection for Y then yields

X = Y.

This argument depended on the bijections A + B = B + A and A + (B + C) = (A + B) + C as well as the well-definedness of infinite disjoint union.
