= Theorem of the gnomon =

Certain parallelograms occurring in a gnomon have areas of equal size

Gnomon: $ABFPGD$ Theorem of the Gnomon: green area = red area, $|AHGD|=|ABFI|,\, |HBFP|=|IPGD|$

The theorem of the gnomon states that certain parallelograms occurring in a gnomon have areas of equal size.

== Theorem ==
In a parallelogram $ABCD$ with a point $P$ on the diagonal $AC$, the parallel to $AD$ through $P$ intersects the side $CD$ in $G$ and the side $AB$ in $H$. Similarly the parallel to the side $AB$ through $P$ intersects the side $AD$ in $I$ and the side $BC$ in $F$. Then the theorem of the gnomon states that the parallelograms $HBFP$ and $IPGD$ have equal areas.

Gnomon is the name for the L-shaped figure consisting of the two overlapping parallelograms $ABFI$ and $AHGD$. The parallelograms of equal area $HBFP$ and $IPGD$ are called complements (of the parallelograms on diagonal $PFCG$ and $AHPI$).

== Proof ==
The proof of the theorem is straightforward if one considers the areas of the main parallelogram and the two inner parallelograms around its diagonal:

- first, the difference between the main parallelogram and the two inner parallelograms is exactly equal to the combined area of the two complements;
- second, all three of them are bisected by the diagonal. This yields:

$$|IPGD|=\frac{|ABCD|}{2}-\frac{|AHPI|}{2}-\frac{|PFCG|}{2}=|HBFP|$$

== Applications and extensions ==
Geometrical representation of a division

Transferring the ratio of a partition of line segment AB to line segment HG: $\tfrac{|AH|}{|HB|}=\tfrac{|HP|}{|PG|}$

The theorem of the gnomon can be used to construct a new parallelogram or rectangle of equal area to a given parallelogram or rectangle by means of straightedge and compass constructions. This also allows the representation of a division of two numbers in geometrical terms, an important feature to reformulate geometrical problems in algebraic terms. More precisely, if two numbers are given as lengths of line segments, one can construct a third line segment, the length of which matches the quotient of those two numbers (see diagram). Another application is to transfer the ratio of partition of one line segment to another line segment (of different length), thus dividing that other line segment in the same ratio as a given line segment and its partition (see diagram).

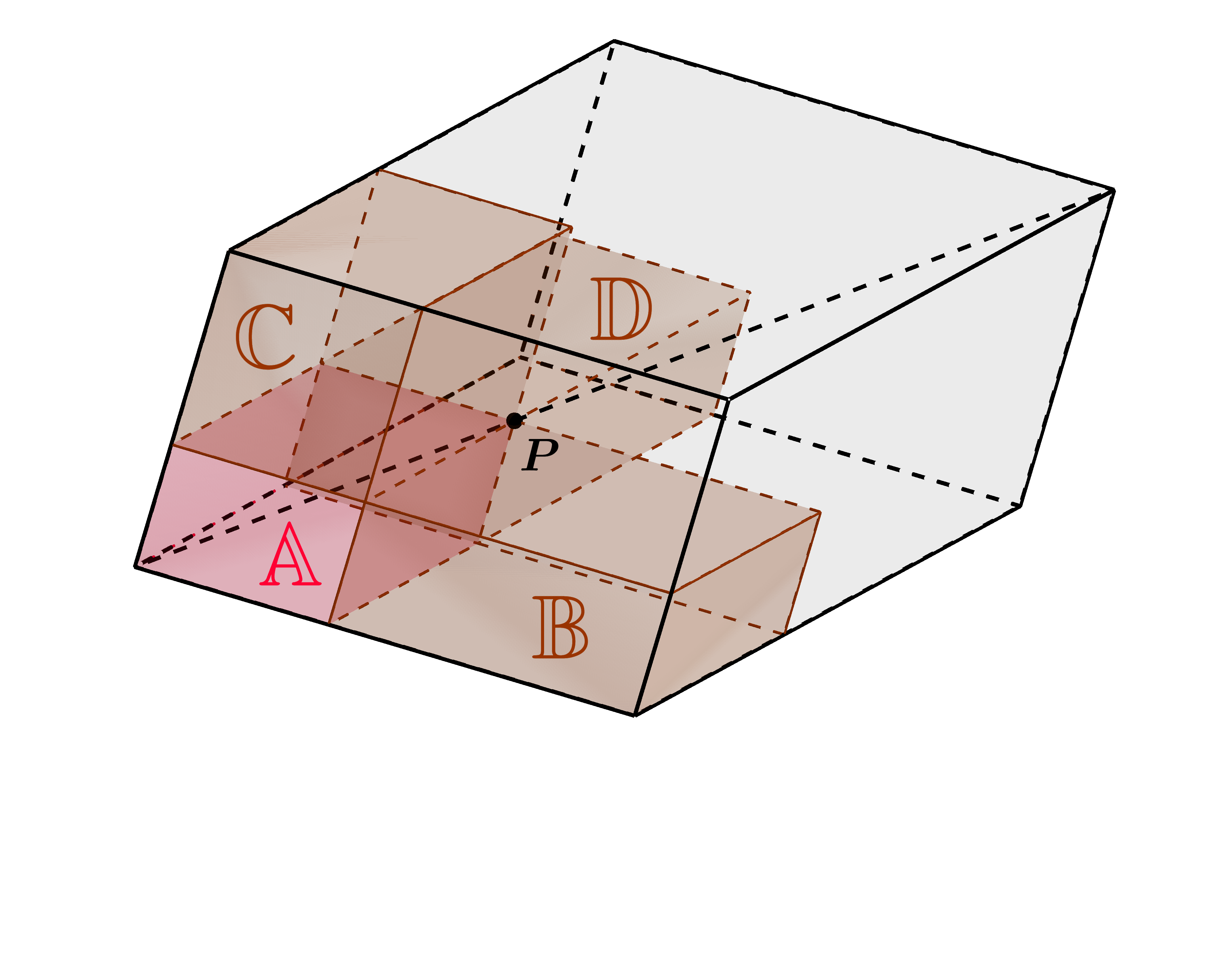
$\mathbb{A}$ is the (lower) parallelepiped around the diagonal with $P$ and its complements $\mathbb{B}$, $\mathbb{C}$ and $\mathbb{D}$ have the same volume: $|\mathbb{B}| = |\mathbb{C}| = |\mathbb{D}|$

A similar statement can be made in three dimensions for parallelepipeds. In this case you have a point $P$ on the space diagonal of a parallelepiped, and instead of two parallel lines you have three planes through $P$, each parallel to the faces of the parallelepiped. The three planes partition the parallelepiped into eight smaller parallelepipeds; two of those surround the diagonal and meet at $P$. Now each of those two parallelepipeds around the diagonal has three of the remaining six parallelepipeds attached to it, and those three play the role of the complements and are of equal volume (see diagram).

== General theorem about nested parallelograms ==
general theorem: green area = blue area - red area

The theorem of the gnomon is special case of a more general statement about nested parallelograms with a common diagonal. For a given parallelogram $ABCD$ consider an arbitrary inner parallelogram $AFCE$ having $AC$ as a diagonal as well. Furthermore there are two uniquely determined parallelograms $GFHD$ and $IBJF$ the sides of which are parallel to the sides of the outer parallelogram and which share the vertex $F$ with the inner parallelogram. Now the difference of the areas of those two parallelograms is equal to area of the inner parallelogram, that is:

$$|AFCE|=|GFHD|-|IBJF|$$

This statement yields the theorem of the gnomon if one looks at a degenerate inner parallelogram $AFCE$ whose vertices are all on the diagonal $AC$. This means in particular for the parallelograms $GFHD$ and $IBJF$, that their common point $F$ is on the diagonal and that the difference of their areas is zero, which is exactly what the theorem of the gnomon states.

== Historical aspects ==
The theorem of the gnomon was described as early as in Euclid's Elements (around 300 BC), and there it plays an important role in the derivation of other theorems. It is given as proposition 43 in Book I of the Elements, where it is phrased as a statement about parallelograms without using the term "gnomon". The latter is introduced by Euclid as the second definition of the second book of the Elements. Further theorems for which the gnomon and its properties play an important role are proposition 6 in Book II, proposition 29 in Book VI, and propositions 1 to 4 in Book XIII.
