= Eigencurve =

In number theory, an eigencurve is a rigid analytic curve that parametrizes certain p-adic families of modular forms, and an eigenvariety is a higher-dimensional generalization of this. Eigencurves were introduced by Coleman and Mazur, and the term "eigenvariety" seems to have been introduced by Buzzard.
