= Gnomon (figure) =

Figure that, added to a given figure, makes a larger figure of the same shape

A gnomon

In geometry, a gnomon is a plane figure formed by removing a similar parallelogram from a corner of a larger parallelogram; or, more generally, a figure that, added to a given figure, makes a larger figure of the same shape.

== Building figurate numbers ==
Figurate numbers were a concern of Pythagorean mathematics, and Pythagoras is credited with the notion that these numbers are generated from a gnomon or basic unit. The gnomon is the piece which needs to be added to a figurate number to transform it to the next bigger one.

For example, the gnomon of the square number n^{2} is the odd number 2n + 1, where n = 1, 2, 3, ... The square of size 8 composed of gnomons looks like this:

$$\begin{matrix}
\color{red} 1 & \color{orange} 2 & \color{yellow} 3 & \color{green} 4 & \color{blue} 5 & \color{indigo} 6 & \color{violet} 7 & \color{pink} 8 \\
\color{orange} 2 & \color{orange} 2 & \color{yellow} 3 & \color{green} 4 & \color{blue} 5 & \color{indigo} 6 & \color{violet} 7 & \color{pink} 8 \\
\color{yellow} 3 & \color{yellow} 3 & \color{yellow} 3 & \color{green} 4 & \color{blue} 5 & \color{indigo} 6 & \color{violet} 7 & \color{pink} 8 \\
\color{green} 4 & \color{green} 4 & \color{green} 4 & \color{green} 4 & \color{blue} 5 & \color{indigo} 6 & \color{violet} 7 & \color{pink} 8 \\
\color{blue} 5 & \color{blue} 5 & \color{blue} 5 & \color{blue} 5 & \color{blue} 5 & \color{indigo} 6 & \color{violet} 7 & \color{pink} 8 \\
\color{indigo} 6 & \color{indigo} 6 & \color{indigo} 6 & \color{indigo} 6 & \color{indigo} 6 & \color{indigo} 6 & \color{violet} 7 & \color{pink} 8 \\
\color{violet} 7 & \color{violet} 7 & \color{violet} 7 & \color{violet} 7 & \color{violet} 7 & \color{violet} 7 & \color{violet} 7 & \color{pink} 8 \\
\color{pink} 8 &\color{pink} 8 &\color{pink} 8 &\color{pink} 8 &\color{pink} 8 &\color{pink} 8 &\color{pink} 8 &\color{pink} 8
\end{matrix}$$

To transform the n-square (the square of size n) to the (n + 1)-square, one adjoins 2n + 1 elements: one to the end of each row (n elements), one to the end of each column (n elements), and a single one to the empty corner. For example, when transforming the 7-square to the 8-square, we add 15 elements; these adjunctions are the 8s in the above figure. This gnomonic technique also provides a proof that the sum of the first n odd numbers is n^{2}; the above figure illustrates
$$1 + 3 + 5 + 7 + 9 + 11 + 13 + 15 = 64 = 8^2.$$

First five terms of Nichomachus's theorem

Applying the same technique to a multiplication table proves the Nicomachus theorem, claiming that each squared triangular number is a sum of consecutive cubes.

== Isosceles triangles ==
In an acute isosceles triangle, it is possible to draw a similar but smaller triangle, one of whose sides is the base of the original triangle. The gnomon of these two similar triangles is the triangle remaining when the smaller of the two similar isosceles triangles is removed from the larger one. The gnomon is itself isosceles if and only if the ratio of the sides to the base of the original isosceles triangle, and the ratio of the base to the sides of the gnomon, is the golden ratio; in this case, the acute isosceles triangle is the golden triangle and its gnomon is the golden gnomon.

Conversely, the acute golden triangle can be the gnomon of the obtuse golden triangle in an exceptional reciprocal exchange of roles.

Golden triangle partitioned into a smaller golden triangle and a smaller (obtuse) golden gnomon

The obtuse golden triangle is the gnomon of the acute golden triangle.

The acute golden triangle is the gnomon of the obtuse golden triangle.

The acute golden triangle is the gnomon of an octagon.

The obtuse golden triangle is the gnomon of an enneagon.

== Metaphor and symbolism ==
A metaphor based around the geometry of a gnomon plays an important role in the literary analysis of James Joyce's Dubliners, involving both a play on words between "paralysis" and "parallelogram", and the geometric meaning of a gnomon as something fragmentary, diminished from its completed shape.

Gnomon shapes are also prominent in Arithmetic Composition I, an abstract painting by Theo van Doesburg.

There is also a very short geometric fairy tale illustrated by animations where gnomons play the role of invaders.

== See also ==
- Theorem of the gnomon
