= Mazur's control theorem =

Describes the behavior in Zp extensions of the Selmer group of an abelian variety

In number theory, Mazur's control theorem, proved by Barry Mazur, describes the behavior of the Selmer group of an abelian variety over a number field in Z_{p}-extensions.
