= Susan H. Marshall =

American mathematician

Susan Hammond Marshall is an American mathematician specializing in number theory, arithmetic geometry, and mathematical proof techniques. She is an associate professor of mathematics at Monmouth University.

== Education and career ==
Marshall is a 1993 graduate of Wake Forest University, majoring in mathematics with a minor in psychology; she cites Wake Forest professors John Baxley and Stephen B. Robinson as early mentors in mathematics. After taking a position analyzing Hubble Space Telescope data at the Goddard Space Flight Center, she went to the University of Arizona for graduate study in mathematics, completing her Ph.D. in 2001. Her dissertation, Crystalline Representations and Neron Models, was supervised by Minhyong Kim.

She was a postdoctoral researcher at the University of Texas at Austin from 2001 to 2004, and joined the Monmouth faculty in 2004.

== Recognition ==
In 2014, Marshall won the Carl B. Allendoerfer Award of the Mathematical Association of America for her exposition with Monmouth colleague Donald R. Smith on the application of control theory to the study of the distribution of prime numbers. In the same year, she also won the Paul R. Halmos – Lester R. Ford Award with Alexander Perlis for their writing on how Heronian tetrahedra can always be realized with integer coordinates. Her article with Smith also won the 2016 Chauvenet Prize.

In 2019 the New Jersey Section of the Mathematical Association of America gave Marshall their Award for Distinguished College or University Teaching of Mathematics.
