= Telescoping (mathematics) =

Property of an iterated binary operation

The collapsing of a telescope, in which successive segments slide into one another and disappear within the structure so that only the outermost parts remain visible, analogously illustrates telescoping in mathematics, where consecutive terms in algebraic expressions cancel each other out after expansion, leaving only the boundary terms.

In mathematics, telescoping refers to a property of certain algebraic expressions or iterated binary operations in which successive terms cancel each other after expansion. As a result, the overall expression simplifies significantly, since most intermediate terms eliminate one another, leaving only a small number of boundary terms from the original structure.

Most commonly, expressions of the form

$$f(n)=g(n+1)-g(n)$$

or

$$f(n)=\frac{g(n+1)}{g(n)},\quad g(n)\neq 0$$

are considered, where $g$ is a function defined on the set of natural numbers.

== Definition ==
Let $A \subseteq \mathbb{Z}$ and let $f,g:A\to \mathbb{R}$.

We say that a function $f$ has the telescoping property with respect to $g$ if one of the following holds:

=== Additive case ===
$$f(n)=g(n+1)-g(n)$$.

Then the sum

$$\sum_{k=m}^{n} f(k)$$

is telescoping.

=== Multiplicative case ===
If $g(n)\neq 0$, then

$$f(n)=\frac{g(n+1)}{g(n)}$$.

Then the product

$$\prod_{k=m}^{n} f(k)$$

reduces telescopically.

== Relation to finite difference operator ==
Let $\Delta$ be the finite difference operator:

$$\Delta g(n)=g(n+1)-g(n)$$.

Then in the additive case:

$$f(n)=\Delta g(n)$$.

This is analogous to the Newton–Leibniz formula:

$$\sum_{k=m}^{n}\Delta g(k)=g(n+1)-g(m)$$.

Similarly for products:

$$\prod_{k=m}^{n}\frac{g(k+1)}{g(k)}=\frac{g(n+1)}{g(m)},\quad g(k)\neq 0$$.

== Examples ==
=== Telescoping sum ===
$$f(n)=\frac{1}{n(n+1)}$$

Decomposition:

$$f(n)=\frac{1}{n}-\frac{1}{n+1}$$

so for $g(n)=-\frac{1}{n}$ we have

$$f(n)=g(n+1)-g(n)$$.

Thus:

$\sum_{k=1}^{n}\frac{1}{k(k+1)}=1-\frac{1}{n+1}$.

=== Telescoping product ===
$$f(n)=\frac{n+1}{n}$$

with $g(n)=n$, so

$\prod_{k=1}^{n}\frac{k+1}{k}=n+1$.

=== Example with Fibonacci numbers ===
Let $F_n$ be the Fibonacci sequence:

$$f(n)=\frac{F_{n+1}}{F_n}$$.

Then:

$\prod_{k=1}^{n}\frac{F_{k+1}}{F_k}=\frac{F_{n+1}}{F_1}=F_{n+1}$.
