= Minhyong Kim =

South Korean mathematician (born 1963)

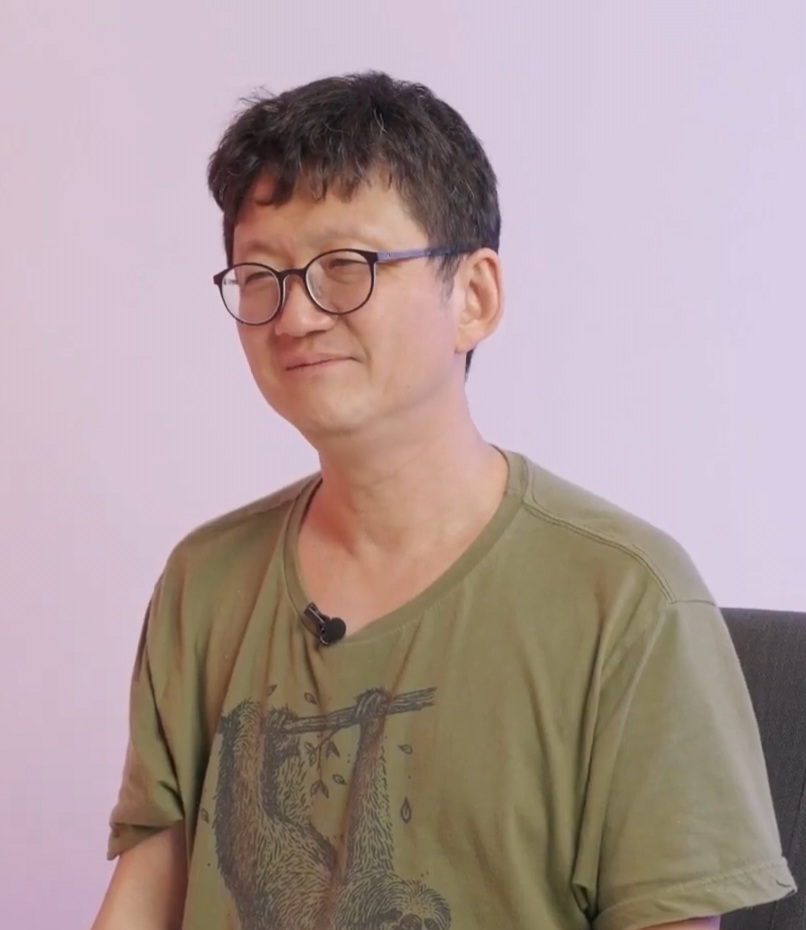
- Born: 1963 (age 62–63); Seoul, South Korea
- Education: Seoul National University (B.S., 1986); Yale University (Ph.D., 1991)
- Known for: Arithmetical Algebraic Geometry
- Awards: Ho-Am Prize (2012)
- Scientific career
- Fields: Mathematics
- Workplaces: University of Edinburgh
- Doctoral advisor: Serge Lang, Barry Mazur
- Doctoral students: Susan H. Marshall

Korean name
- Hangul: 김민형
- RR: Gim Minhyeong
- MR: Kim Minhyŏng

Minhyong Kim (Korean: 김민형) is a South Korean mathematician who specialises in arithmetic geometry and anabelian geometry.

== Biography ==
Kim received his PhD at Yale University in 1990 under the supervision of Serge Lang and Barry Mazur, going on to work in a number of universities, including M.I.T., Columbia, Arizona, Purdue, the Korea Institute for Advanced Study, UCL (University College London), the University of Oxford, where he was Head of the Number Theory Research Group, and the University of Warwick, where he was the Christopher Zeeman Professor of Algebra, Geometry, and the Public Understanding of Mathematics. He is currently the Director of the International Centre for Mathematical Sciences and Sir Edmund Whittaker Professor of Mathematical Sciences at the Maxwell Institute, the joint graduate school of the University of Edinburgh and Heriot-Watt University.

He is married to Larissa McGoldrick, a former dancer for Merce Cunningham. They have two sons, Oisin and Niall. Kim's father is the literature scholar Kim Uchang and his brother is the biologist Junhyong Kim.

== Research ==
Kim has made contributions to the application of arithmetic homotopy theory to the study of Diophantine problems, especially to finiteness theorems of the Faltings–Siegel type.

His work was featured in 2017 in the Quanta Magazine, where he described his work as being inspired by physics.

== Awards ==
In 2012, Minhyong Kim received the Ho-Am Prize for Science, with the Ho-Am committee citing him as "one of the leading researchers in the area of arithmetic algebraic geometry". He was elected as a Fellow of the American Mathematical Society in their 2024 class of fellows., and was elected as a Fellow of the Royal Society of Edinburgh in their 2025 class of fellows. In 2026, he was elected as an inaugural fellow of the UK Academy for the Mathematical Sciences.

== Selected publications ==
- "p-adic L-functions and Selmer varieties associated to elliptic curves with complex multiplication", Annals of Mathematics
- "The motivic fundamental group of P1\{0,1,∞} and the theorem of Siegel", Inventiones Mathematicae
- "Massey products for elliptic curves of rank 1", Journal of the American Mathematical Society
- "Selmer varieties for curves with CM Jacobians" (with John H. Coates)
