= Robert Pollack =

Robert Pollack, Pollock or Pollok may refer to:

- Robert Pollack (biologist), American biologist
- Rocky Pollack, Manitoba judge
- Robert Pollock (actor) (born 1960), New Zealand actor
- Robert Pollock (principal) (1709–1759), Church of Scotland minister and principal of Marischal College, Aberdeen
- Sir Robert Pollock, 1st Baronet (c. 1665–1735), British Army officer and Scottish politician
- Robert L. Pollock, business writer for The Wall Street Journal
- Robert M. Pollock (1856–1920), Republican member of the North Dakota House of Representatives
- Robert Mason Pollock (1926–2012), American television writer
- Robert A. Pollock (1870–1956), American politician from Ohio
- Robert A. Pollock (1930–2003), footballer turned writer-novelist who wrote the novel Loophole
- Robert Pollok (poet) (1798–1827), Scottish poet best known for The Course of Time
- Robert Pollok (British Army officer) (1884–1979), Irish-born British Army officer

== See also ==
- Robert A. Pollak, economist
