= Telescoping series =

Series whose partial sums eventually only have a fixed number of terms after cancellation

In mathematics, a telescoping series is a series whose general term $t_n$ is of the form $t_n=a_n-a_{n-1}$, i.e. the difference of two consecutive terms of a sequence $(a_n)$. As a consequence the partial sums of the series only consists of two terms of $(a_n)$ after cancellation.

The cancellation technique, with part of each term cancelling with part of the next term, is known as the method of differences.

An early statement of the formula for the sum or partial sums of a telescoping series can be found in a 1644 work by Evangelista Torricelli, De dimensione parabolae.

== Definition ==
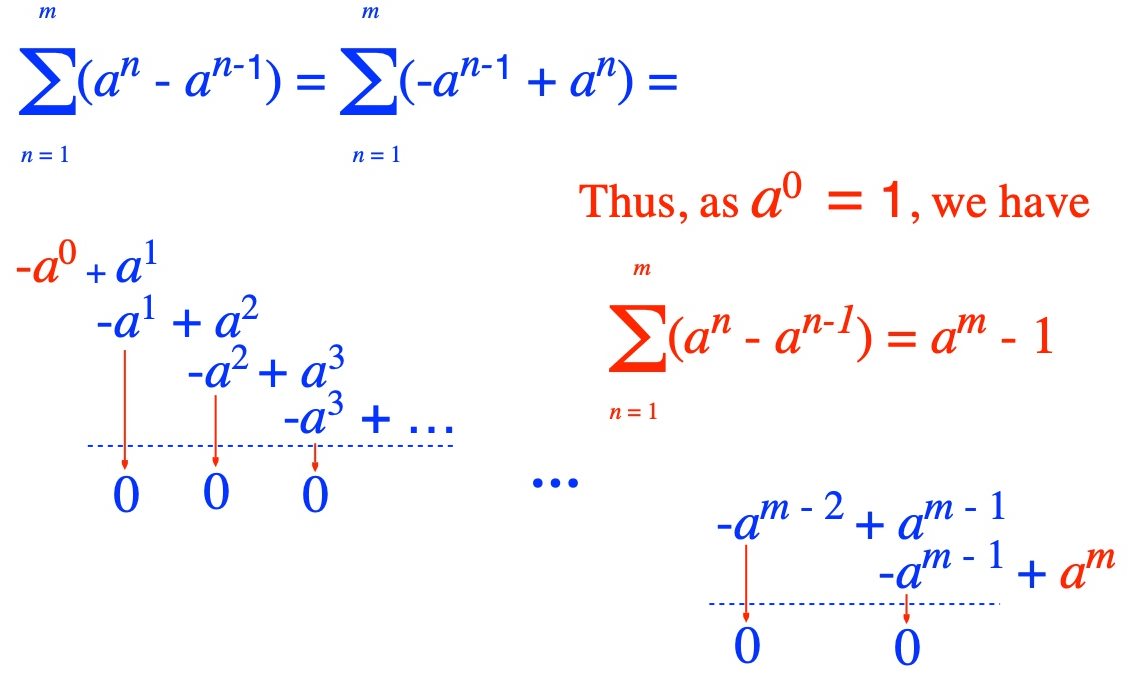
A telescoping series of powers. Note in the summation sign, $\sum$, the index n goes from 1 to m. There is no relationship between n and m beyond the fact that both are natural numbers.

Telescoping sums are finite sums in which pairs of consecutive terms partly cancel each other, leaving only parts of the initial and final terms. Let $a_n$ be the elements of a sequence of numbers. Then
$$\sum_{n=1}^N \left(a_n - a_{n-1}\right) =  a_N - a_0.$$
If $a_n$ converges to a limit $L$, the telescoping series gives:
$$\sum_{n=1}^\infty \left(a_n - a_{n-1}\right) = L-a_0.$$

Every series is a telescoping series of its own partial sums.

== Examples ==
- The product of a finite geometric series with initial term $a$ and common ratio $r$ by the factor $(1 - r)$ yields a telescoping sum:
  $$(1 - r) \sum^n_{k=0} ar^k = \sum^n_{k=0} \left(ar^k - ar^{k+1}\right) = a - a r^{n+1}$$
  When $|r| < 1$, this allows for a direct calculation of its limit as $n \rightarrow \infty$ and implies:
  $$\sum^\infty_{k=0} ar^k = \frac{a}{1 - r}.$$
- The series
  $$\sum_{n=1}^\infty\frac{1}{n(n+1)}$$
  is the series of reciprocals of pronic numbers, and it is recognizable as a telescoping series once rewritten in partial fraction form
  $$\begin{align}
\sum_{n=1}^\infty \frac{1}{n(n+1)} & = \sum_{n=1}^\infty \left( \frac{1}{n} - \frac{1}{n+1} \right) \\
& = \lim_{N\to\infty} \sum_{n=1}^N \left( \frac{1}{n} - \frac{1}{n+1} \right) \\
& = \lim_{N\to\infty} \left\lbrack {\left(1 - \frac{1}{2}\right) + \left(\frac{1}{2} - \frac{1}{3}\right) + \cdots + \left(\frac{1}{N} - \frac{1}{N+1}\right) } \right\rbrack  \\
& = \lim_{N\to\infty} \left\lbrack {  1 + \left( - \frac{1}{2} + \frac{1}{2}\right) + \left( - \frac{1}{3} + \frac{1}{3}\right) + \cdots + \left( - \frac{1}{N} + \frac{1}{N}\right) - \frac{1}{N+1} } \right\rbrack \\
& = \lim_{N\to\infty} \left\lbrack {  1  - \frac{1}{N+1} } \right\rbrack = 1.
\end{align}$$
- Let k be a positive integer. Then
  $$\sum^\infty_{n=1} {\frac{1}{n(n+k)}} = \frac{H_k}{k}$$
  where H_{k} is the kth harmonic number.
- Let k and m with k $\neq$ m be positive integers. Then
  $$\sum^\infty_{n=1} {\frac{1}{(n+k)(n+k+1)\dots(n+m-1)(n+m)}} = \frac{1}{m-k} \cdot \frac{k!}{m!}$$
  where $!$ denotes the factorial operation.
- Many trigonometric functions also admit representation as differences, which may reveal telescopic canceling between the consecutive terms. Using the angle addition identity for a product of sines,
  $$\begin{align}
\sum_{n=1}^N \sin\left(n\right) & {} = \sum_{n=1}^N \frac{1}{2} \csc\left(\frac{1}{2}\right) \left(2\sin\left(\frac{1}{2}\right)\sin\left(n\right)\right) \\
& {} =\frac{1}{2} \csc\left(\frac{1}{2}\right) \sum_{n=1}^N \left(\cos\left(\frac{2n-1}{2}\right) -\cos\left(\frac{2n+1}{2}\right)\right) \\
& {} =\frac{1}{2} \csc\left(\frac{1}{2}\right) \left(\cos\left(\frac{1}{2}\right) -\cos\left(\frac{2N+1}{2}\right)\right),
\end{align}$$
  which does not converge as $N \rightarrow \infty.$

== Applications ==
In probability theory, a Poisson process is a stochastic process of which the simplest case involves "occurrences" at random times, the waiting time until the next occurrence having a memoryless exponential distribution, and the number of "occurrences" in any time interval having a Poisson distribution whose expected value is proportional to the length of the time interval. Let X_{t} be the number of "occurrences" before time t, and let T_{x} be the waiting time until the xth "occurrence". We seek the probability density function of the random variable T_{x}. We use the probability mass function for the Poisson distribution, which tells us that

$$\Pr(X_t = x) = \frac{(\lambda t)^x e^{-\lambda t}}{x!},$$

where λ is the average number of occurrences in any time interval of length 1. Observe that the event {X_{t} ≥ x} is the same as the event {T_{x} ≤ t}, and thus they have the same probability. Intuitively, if something occurs at least $x$ times before time $t$, we have to wait at most $t$ for the $x$th occurrence. The density function we seek is therefore

$$\begin{align}
f(t) & = \frac{\mathrm{d}}{\mathrm{d}t}\Pr(T_x \le t) \\
& = \frac{\mathrm{d}}{\mathrm{d}t}\Pr(X_t \ge x) \\
& = \frac{\mathrm{d}}{\mathrm{d}t}(1 - \Pr(X_t \le x-1)) \\
& =  \frac{\mathrm{d}}{\mathrm{d}t}\left( 1 - \sum_{u=0}^{x-1} \Pr(X_t = u)\right) \\
& = \frac{\mathrm{d}}{\mathrm{d}t}\left( 1 - \sum_{u=0}^{x-1} \frac{(\lambda t)^u e^{-\lambda t}}{u!}  \right) \\
& = \lambda e^{-\lambda t} - e^{-\lambda t} \sum_{u=1}^{x-1} \left( \frac{\lambda^ut^{u-1}}{(u-1)!} - \frac{\lambda^{u+1} t^u}{u!} \right)
\end{align}$$

The sum telescopes, leaving

$$f(t) = \frac{\lambda^x t^{x-1} e^{-\lambda t}}{(x-1)!}.$$

For other applications, see:

- Proof that the sum of the reciprocals of the primes diverges, where one of the proofs uses a telescoping sum;
- Fundamental theorem of calculus, a continuous analog of telescoping series;
- Order statistic, where a telescoping sum occurs in the derivation of a probability density function;
- Lefschetz fixed-point theorem, where a telescoping sum arises in algebraic topology;
- Homology theory, concept in algebraic topology;
- Eilenberg–Mazur swindle, where a telescoping sum of knots occurs;
- Faddeev–LeVerrier algorithm.

== Related concepts ==
A telescoping product is a finite product (or the partial product of an infinite product) that can be canceled by the method of quotients to be eventually only a finite number of factors. It is the finite products in which consecutive terms cancel denominator with numerator, leaving only the initial and final terms. Let $a_n$ be a sequence of numbers. Then,
$$\prod_{n=1}^N \frac{a_{n-1}}{a_n} =  \frac{a_0}{a_N}.$$
If $a_n$ converges to 1, the resulting product gives:
$$\prod_{n=1}^\infty \frac{a_{n-1}}{a_n} = a_0$$

For example, the infinite product
$$\prod_{n=2}^{\infty} \left(1-\frac{1}{n^2} \right)$$
simplifies as
$$\begin{align}
\prod_{n=2}^{\infty} \left(1-\frac{1}{n^2} \right)
&=\prod_{n=2}^{\infty}\frac{(n-1)(n+1)}{n^2}
\\
&=\lim_{N\to\infty} \prod_{n=2}^{N}\frac{n-1}{n} \times \prod_{n=2}^{N}\frac{n+1}{n}
\\
&= \lim_{N\to\infty} \left\lbrack {\frac{1}{2} \times \frac{2}{3}  \times \frac{3}{4} \times \cdots \times \frac{N-1}{N}} \right\rbrack
\times \left\lbrack {\frac{3}{2} \times \frac{4}{3} \times \frac{5}{4} \times \cdots \times \frac{N}{N-1} \times \frac{N+1}{N}} \right\rbrack
\\
&= \lim_{N\to\infty} \left\lbrack \frac{1}{2} \right\rbrack \times \left\lbrack \frac{N+1}{N} \right\rbrack
\\
&= \frac{1}{2}\times \lim_{N\to\infty} \left\lbrack \frac{N+1}{N} \right\rbrack
\\
&=\frac{1}{2}.
\end{align}$$
