= Plane partition =

Array of nonnegative integers in combinatorics

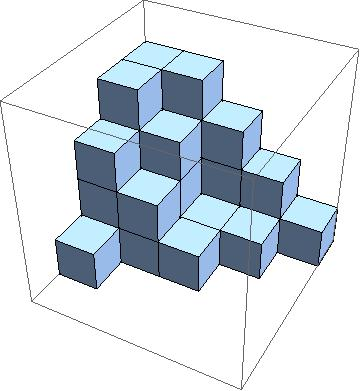
A plane partition of 30 represented as stacks of unit cubes

In mathematics and especially in combinatorics, a plane partition is a two-dimensional array of nonnegative integers $\pi_{i,j}$ (with positive integer indices i and j) that is nonincreasing in both indices. This means that

$\pi_{i,j} \ge \pi_{i,j+1}$ and $\pi_{i,j} \ge \pi_{i+1,j}$ for all i and j.

Moreover, only finitely many of the $\pi_{i, j}$ may be nonzero. Plane partitions are a generalization of partitions of an integer.

A plane partition may be represented visually by the placement of a stack of $\pi_{i,j}$ unit cubes above the point (i, j) in the plane, giving a three-dimensional solid as shown in the picture. The image has matrix form

$$\begin{matrix}
4 & 4 & 3 & 2 & 1\\
4 & 3 & 1 & 1\\
3 & 2 & 1\\
1
\end{matrix}$$

Plane partitions are also often described by the positions of the unit cubes. From this point of view, a plane partition can be defined as a finite subset $\mathcal{P}$ of positive integer lattice points (i, j, k) in $\mathbb{N}^3$, such that if (r, s, t) lies in $\mathcal{P}$ and if $(i, j, k)$ satisfies $1\leq i\leq r$, $1\leq j\leq s$, and $1\leq k\leq t$, then (i, j, k) also lies in $\mathcal{P}$.

The sum of a plane partition is

$$n=\sum_{i,j} \pi_{i,j} .$$

The sum describes the number of cubes of which the plane partition consists. Much interest in plane partitions concerns the enumeration of plane partitions in various classes. The number of plane partitions with sum n is denoted by PL(n). For example, there are six plane partitions with sum 3

$$\begin{matrix} 3 \end{matrix}
\qquad \begin{matrix} 2 & 1 \end{matrix}
\qquad \begin{matrix} 1 & 1 & 1 \end{matrix}
\qquad \begin{matrix} 2 \\ 1 \end{matrix}
\qquad \begin{matrix} 1 & 1 \\ 1 \end{matrix}
\qquad \begin{matrix} 1 \\ 1 \\ 1 \end{matrix}$$

so PL(3) = 6.

Plane partitions may be classified by how symmetric they are. Many symmetric classes of plane partitions are enumerated by simple product formulas.

== Generating function of plane partitions ==
The generating function for PL(n) is

$\sum_{n=0}^\infty \operatorname{PL}(n) x^n = \prod_{k=1}^\infty \frac{1}{(1-x^k)^k} = 1+x+3x^2+6x^3+13x^4+24x^5+\cdots\qquad$(sequence A000219 in the OEIS).

It is sometimes referred to as the MacMahon function, as it was discovered by Percy A. MacMahon.

This formula may be viewed as the 2-dimensional analogue of Euler's product formula for the number of integer partitions of n. There is no analogous formula known for partitions in higher dimensions (i.e., for solid partitions). The asymptotics for plane partitions were first calculated by E. M. Wright. One obtains, for large $n$, that (Note: Here the typographical error (in Wright's paper) has been corrected, pointed out by Mutafchiev and Kamenov.)

$$\operatorname{PL}(n)\sim \frac{ \zeta(3)^{7/36}}{\sqrt{12\pi}}\ \left(\frac{n}{2}\right)^{-25/36} \ \exp\left(3\ \zeta(3)^{1/3} \left(\frac{n}2\right)^{2/3}+ \zeta'(-1)\right) .$$

Evaluating numerically yields

$$\ln \operatorname{PL}(n) \sim 2.00945n^{2/3} -0.69444 \ln n -1.4631.$$

=== Plane partitions in a box ===
Around 1896, MacMahon set up the generating function of plane partitions that are subsets of the $r \times s \times t$ box $\mathcal{B}(r,s,t)=\{(i,j,k)|1\leq i\leq r, 1\leq j\leq s, 1\leq k\leq t\}$ in his first paper on plane partitions. The formula is given by
$$\sum_{\pi\in\mathcal{B}(r,s,t)}q^{|\pi|}=\prod_{i=1}^r\prod_{j=1}^s\frac{1-q^{i+j+t-1}}{1-q^{i+j-1}}$$

A proof of this formula can be found in the book Combinatory Analysis written by MacMahon. MacMahon also mentions the generating functions of plane partitions. The formula for the generating function can be written in an alternative way, which is given by
$$\sum_{\pi\in\mathcal{B}(r,s,t)}q^{|\pi|}=\prod_{i=1}^r\prod_{j=1}^s\prod_{k=1}^t\frac{1-q^{i+j+k-1}}{1-q^{i+j+k-2}}$$

Multiplying each component by $\textstyle\frac{1-q}{1-q}$, and setting q = 1 in the formulas above yields that the total number $N_1(r, s, t)$ of plane partitions that fit in the $r \times s \times t$ box $\mathcal{B}(r,s,t)$ is equal to the following product formula:
$$N_1(r,s,t)=\prod_{(i,j,k)\in \mathcal{B}(r,s,t)}\frac{i+j+k-1}{i+j+k-2}=\prod_{i=1}^{r}\prod_{j=1}^{s}\frac{i+j+t-1}{i+j-1}.$$
The planar case (when t = 1) yields the binomial coefficients:

$$\mathcal{B}(r,s,1) = \binom{r+s}{r}.$$

The general solution is

$$\begin{align}
\mathcal{B}(r,s,t) &= \prod_{k=1}^t \frac{(r+s+k-1)!(k-1)!}{(r+k-1)!(s+k-1)!}
\\&= \prod_{k=1}^t \frac{\binom{r+s+k-1}{r+k-1}\binom{r+s+k-1}{s+k-1}}{\binom{r+s+k-1}{r}\binom{s+k-1}{s}}
\end{align}$$

The isometric projection of the unit cubes representing a plane partition in a box gives a bijection between these plane partitions and rhombus tilings of a hexagon with the same edge lengths as the box.

== Special plane partitions ==
Special plane partitions include symmetric, cyclic and self-complementary plane partitions, and combinations of these properties.

In the subsequent sections, the enumeration of special sub-classes of plane partitions inside a box are considered. These articles use the notation $N_i(r,s,t)$ for the number of such plane partitions, where r, s, and t are the dimensions of the box under consideration, and i is the index for the case being considered.

=== Action of S_{2}, S_{3} and C_{3} on plane partitions ===
$\mathcal{S}_2$ is the group of permutations acting on the first two coordinates of a point. This group contains the identity, which sends (i, j, k) to itself, and the transposition (i, j, k) → (j, i, k). The number of elements in an orbit $\eta$ is denoted by $|\eta|$. $\mathcal{B}/\mathcal{S}_2$ denotes the set of orbits of elements of $\mathcal{B}$ under the action of $\mathcal{S}_2$. The height of an element (i, j, k) is defined by
$$ht(i,j,k)=i+j+k-2.$$
The height increases by one for each step away from the back right corner. For example, the corner position (1, 1, 1) has height 1 and ht(2, 1, 1) = 2. The height of an orbit is defined to be the height of any element in the orbit. This notation of the height differs from the notation of Ian G. Macdonald.

There is a natural action of the permutation group $\mathcal{S}_3$ on a Ferrers diagram of a plane partition—this corresponds to simultaneously permuting the three coordinates of all nodes. This generalizes the conjugation operation for integer partitions. The action of $\mathcal{S}_3$ can generate new plane partitions starting from a given plane partition. Below there are shown six plane partitions of 4 that are generated by the $\mathcal{S}_3$ action. Only the exchange of the first two coordinates is manifest in the representation given below.

$$\begin{smallmatrix} 3 & 1 \end{smallmatrix} \quad
\begin{smallmatrix} 3 \\ 1 \end{smallmatrix} \quad
\begin{smallmatrix} 2 &  1 & 1\end{smallmatrix} \quad
\begin{smallmatrix} 2 \\ 1 \\ 1  \end{smallmatrix} \quad
\begin{smallmatrix} 1 & 1 & 1 \\ 1 \end{smallmatrix} \quad
\begin{smallmatrix} 1 & 1 \\ 1 \\ 1 \end{smallmatrix}$$

$\mathcal{C}_3$ is called the group of cyclic permutations and consists of

$$(i,j,k)\rightarrow(i,j,k), \quad (i,j,k)\rightarrow(j,k,i), \quad \text{and }\quad (i,j,k)\rightarrow(k,i,j).$$

=== Symmetric plane partitions ===
A plane partition $\pi$ is called symmetric if π_{i,j} = π_{j,i} for all i, j. In other words, a plane partition is symmetric if $(i, j, k)\in \mathcal{B}(r,s,t)$ if and only if $(j, i, k) \in\mathcal{B}(r,s,t)$. Plane partitions of this type are symmetric with respect to the plane x = y. Below is an example of a symmetric plane partition and its visualisation.

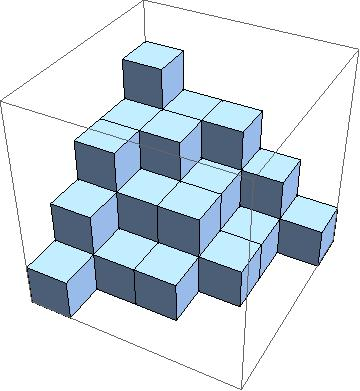
A symmetric plane partition, sum 35

$$\begin{matrix} 4 &3 &3 &2 &1\\
3 &3 &2 &1 &\\
3 &2 &2 &1 &\\
2 &1 &1 & & \\
1 & & & & \end{matrix}$$

In 1898, MacMahon formulated his conjecture about the generating function for symmetric plane partitions which are subsets of $\mathcal{B}(r,r,t)$. This conjecture is called the MacMahon conjecture. The generating function is given by
$$\sum_{\pi\in\mathcal{B}(r,r,t)/\mathcal{S}_2}q^{|\pi|}=\prod_{i=1}^r\left[\frac{1-q^{t+2i-1}}{1-q^{2i-1}}\prod_{j=i+1}^r\frac{1-q^{2(i+j+t-1)}}{1-q^{2(i+j-1)}}\right]$$

Macdonald pointed out that Percy A. MacMahon's conjecture reduces to

$$\sum_{\pi\in\mathcal{B}(r,r,t)/\mathcal{S}_2}q^{|\pi|}=\prod_{\eta\in\mathcal{B}(r,r,t)/\mathcal{S}_2}\frac{1-q^{|\eta|(1+ht(\eta))}}{1-q^{|\eta|ht(\eta)}}$$

In 1972 Edward A. Bender and Donald E. Knuth conjectured a simple closed form for the generating function for plane partitions which have at most r rows and strict decrease along the rows. George Andrews showed that the conjecture of Bender and Knuth and the MacMahon conjecture are equivalent. MacMahon's conjecture was proven almost simultaneously by George Andrews in 1977 and later Ian G. Macdonald presented an alternative proof. When setting q = 1 yields the counting function $N_2(r,r,t)$ which is given by

$$N_2(r,r,t)=\prod_{i=1}^{r}\frac{2i+t-1}{2i-1}\prod_{1\leq i< j\leq r}\frac{i+j+t-1}{i+j-1}$$

For a proof of the case q = 1 please refer to George Andrews' paper MacMahon's conjecture on symmetric plane partitions.

=== Cyclically symmetric plane partitions ===
π is called cyclically symmetric, if the i-th row of $\pi$ is conjugate to the i-th column for all i. The i-th row is regarded as an ordinary partition. The conjugate of a partition $\pi$ is the partition whose diagram is the transpose of partition $\pi$. In other words, the plane partition is cyclically symmetric if whenever $(i,j,k)\in\mathcal{B}(r,s,t)$ then (k, i, j) and (j, k, i) also belong to $\mathcal{B}(r,s,t)$. Below an example of a cyclically symmetric plane partition and its visualization is given.

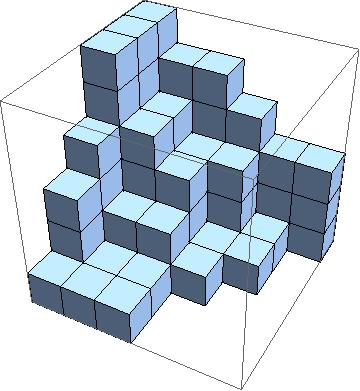
A cyclically symmetric plane partition

$$\begin{matrix}
6 &5 &5 &4 &3 &3\\
6 &4 &3 &3 &1 &\\
6 &4 &3 &1 &1 &\\
4 &2 &2 &1 & &\\
3 &1 &1 & & &\\
1 &1 &1 & & &
\end{matrix}$$

Macdonald's conjecture provides a formula for calculating the number of cyclically symmetric plane partitions for a given integer r. This conjecture is called the Macdonald conjecture. The generating function for cyclically symmetric plane partitions which are subsets of $\mathcal{B}(r,r,r)$ is given by

$$\sum_{\pi\in\mathcal{B}(r,r,r)/\mathcal{C}_3}q^{|\pi|}=\prod_{\eta\in\mathcal{B}(r,r,r)/\mathcal{C}_3}\frac{1-q^{|\eta|(1+ht(\eta))}}{1-q^{|\eta|ht(\eta)}}$$

This equation can also be written in another way

$$\prod_{\eta\in\mathcal{B}(r,r,r)/\mathcal{C}_3}\frac{1-q^{|\eta|(1+ht(\eta))}}{1-q^{|\eta|ht(\eta)}}=\prod_{i=1}^r\left[\frac{1-q^{3i-1}}{1-q^{3i-2}}\prod_{j=i}^r\frac{1-q^{3(r+i+j-1)}}{1-q^{3(2i+j-1)}}\right]$$

In 1979, Andrews proved Macdonald's conjecture for the case q = 1 as the "weak" Macdonald conjecture. Three years later William H. Mills, David Robbins and Howard Rumsey proved the general case of Macdonald's conjecture in their paper Proof of the Macdonald conjecture. The formula for $N_3(r,r,r)$ is given by the "weak" Macdonald conjecture

$$N_3(r,r,r)=\prod_{i=1}^{r}\left[\frac{3i-1}{3i-2}\prod_{j=i}^r\frac{i+j+r-1}{2i+j-1}\right]$$

=== Totally symmetric plane partitions ===
A totally symmetric plane partition $\pi$ is a plane partition which is symmetric and cyclically symmetric. This means that the diagram is symmetric at all three diagonal planes, or in other words that if $(i, j, k)\in\mathcal{B}(r,s,t)$ then all six permutations of (i, j, k) are also in $\mathcal{B}(r,s,t)$. Below an example of a matrix for a totally symmetric plane partition is given. The picture shows the visualisation of the matrix.

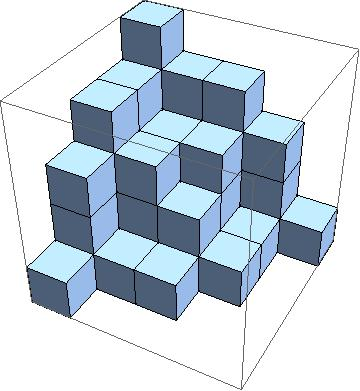
A totally symmetric plane partition

$$\begin{matrix}
5 &4 &4 &3 &1\\
4 &3 &3 &1 &\\
4 &3 &2 &1 &\\
3 &1 &1 & & \\
1 & & &&
\end{matrix}$$

Macdonald found the total number of totally symmetric plane partitions that are subsets of $\mathcal{B}(r,r,r)$. The formula is given by

$$N_4(r,r,r)=\prod_{\eta\in\mathcal{B}(r,r,r)/\mathcal{S}_3}\frac{1+ht(\eta)}{ht(\eta)}$$

In 1995 John R. Stembridge first proved the formula for $N_4(r,r,r)$ and later in 2005 it was proven by George Andrews, Peter Paule, and Carsten Schneider. Around 1983 Andrews and Robbins independently stated an explicit product formula for the orbit-counting generating function for totally symmetric plane partitions. This formula already alluded to in George E. Andrews' paper Totally symmetric plane partitions which was published 1980. The conjecture is called The q-TSPP conjecture and it is given by:

Let $\mathcal{S}_3$ be the symmetric group. The orbit counting function for totally symmetric plane partitions that fit inside $\mathcal{B}(r,r,r)$ is given by the formula

$$\sum_{\pi\in\mathcal{B}(r,r,r)/\mathcal{S}_3}q^{|\pi|}=\prod_{\eta\in\mathcal{B}(r,r,r)/\mathcal{S}_3}\frac{1-q^{1+ht(\eta)}}{1-q^{ht(\eta)}} = \prod_{1\leq i\leq j\leq k\leq r} \frac{1-q^{i+j+k-1}}{1-q^{i+j+k-2}}.$$

This conjecture was proved in 2011 by Christoph Koutschan, Manuel Kauers and Doron Zeilberger.

=== Self-complementary plane partitions ===
If $\pi_{i,j}+\pi_{r-i+1,s-j+1}=t$ for all $1\leq i \leq r$, $1\leq j \leq s$, then the plane partition is called self-complementary. It is necessary that the product $r\cdot s\cdot t$ is even. Below an example of a self-complementary symmetric plane partition and its visualisation is given.

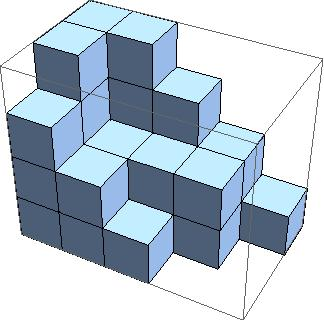
A self-complementary plane partition

$$\begin{matrix}
4 &4 &3 &2 &1\\
4 &2 &2 &2 &\\
3 &2 &1 & &
\end{matrix}$$

Richard P. Stanley conjectured formulas for the total number of self-complementary plane partitions $N_5(r,s,t)$. According to Stanley, Robbins also formulated formulas for the total number of self-complementary plane partitions in a different but equivalent form. The total number of self-complementary plane partitions that are subsets of $\mathcal{B}(r,s,t)$ is given by

$$N_5(2r,2s,2t)=N_1(r,s,t)^2$$

$$N_5(2r+1,2s,2t)=N_1(r,s,t)N_1(r+1,s,t)$$

$$N_5(2r+1,2s+1,2t)=N_1(r+1,s,t)N_1(r,s+1,t)$$

It is necessary that the product of r,s and t is even. A proof can be found in the paper Symmetries of Plane Partitions which was written by Stanley. The proof works with Schur functions $s_{s^r}(x)$. Stanley's proof of the ordinary enumeration of self-complementary plane partitions yields the q-analogue by substituting $x_i=q^i$ for $i=1,\ldots,n$. This is a special case of Stanley's hook-content formula. The generating function for self-complementary plane partitions is given by

$$s_{\gamma^\alpha}(q,q^2,\ldots,q^n)=q^{\gamma\alpha(\alpha+1)/2}\prod_{i=1}^\alpha \prod_{j=0}^{\gamma-1}\frac{1-q^{i+n-\alpha+j}}{1-q^{i+j}}$$

Substituting this formula in

$$s_{s^r}(x_1,x_2,\ldots,x_{t+r})^2 \ \text{ for } \mathcal{B}(2r,2s,2t)$$

$$s_{s^r}(x_1,x_2,\ldots,x_{t+r}) s_{(s+1)^r}(x_1,x_2,\ldots,x_{t+r}) \text{ for } \mathcal{B}(2r,2s+1,2t)$$

$$s_{s^{r+1}}(x_1,x_2,\ldots,x_{t+r+1}) s_{s^r}(x_1,x_2,\ldots,x_{t+r+1}) \text{ for } \mathcal{B}(2r+1,2s,2t+1)$$

supplies the desired q-analogue case.

=== Cyclically symmetric self-complementary plane partitions ===
A plane partition $\pi$ is called cyclically symmetric self-complementary if it is cyclically symmetric and self-complementary. The figure presents a cyclically symmetric self-complementary plane partition and the according matrix is below.

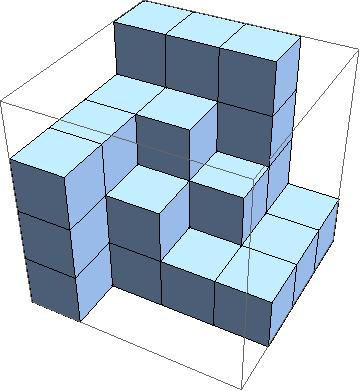
A cyclically symmetric self-complementary plane partition

$$\begin{matrix}
4 &4 &4 &1\\
3 &3 &2 &1\\
3 &2 &1 &1\\
3 & & &
\end{matrix}$$

In a private communication with Stanley, Robbins conjectured that the total number of cyclically symmetric self-complementary plane partitions is given by $N_6(2r,2r,2r)$. The total number of cyclically symmetric self-complementary plane partitions is given by

$$N_6(2r,2r,2r)=D_r^2$$

$D_r$ is the number of $r\times r$ alternating sign matrices. A formula for $D_r$ is given by

$$D_r=\prod_{j=0}^{r-1}\frac{(3j+1)!}{(r+j)!}$$

Greg Kuperberg proved the formula for $N_6(r,r,r)$ in 1994.

=== Totally symmetric self-complementary plane partitions ===
A totally symmetric self-complementary plane partition is a plane partition that is both totally symmetric and self-complementary. For instance, the matrix below is such a plane partition; it is visualised in the accompanying picture.

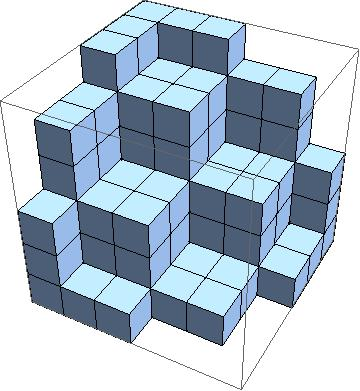
A totally symmetric self-complementary plane partition

$$\begin{matrix}
6 &6 &6 &5 &5 &3\\
6 &5 &5 &3 &3 &1\\
6 &5 &5 &3 &3 &1\\
5 &3 &3 &1 &1 & \\
5 &3 &3 &1 &1 & \\
3 &1 &1 & & &
\end{matrix}$$

The formula $N_7(r,r,r)$ was conjectured by William H. Mills, Robbins and Howard Rumsey in their work Self-Complementary Totally Symmetric Plane Partitions. The total number of totally symmetric self-complementary plane partitions is given by

$$N_7(2r,2r,2r)=D_r$$

Andrews proved this formula in 1994 in his paper Plane Partitions V: The TSSCPP Conjecture.

== See also ==
- Gaussian binomial coefficients
- Voxel
