= Ira Gessel =

American mathematician (born 1951)

Ira Martin Gessel (born 9 April 1951) is an American mathematician, known for his work in combinatorics. He is a long-time faculty member at Brandeis University and resides in Arlington, Massachusetts.

== Education and career ==
Gessel studied at Harvard University graduating magna cum laude in 1973. There, he became a Putnam Fellow in 1972, alongside Arthur Rubin and David Vogan.

He received his Ph.D. at MIT and was the first student of Richard P. Stanley. He was then a postdoctoral fellow at the IBM Watson Research Center and MIT. He then joined Brandeis University faculty in 1984. He was promoted to professor of mathematics and computer science in 1990, became a chair in 1996–98, and professor emeritus in 2015.

Gessel is a prolific contributor to enumerative and algebraic combinatorics. He is credited with the invention of quasisymmetric functions in 1984 and foundational work on the Lagrange inversion theorem. As of 2017, Gessel was an advisor of 27 Ph.D. students.

Gessel was elected a fellow of the American Mathematical Society in the inaugural class of 2012. Since 2015, he is an associate editor of the Digital Library of Mathematical Functions.

== Gessel's lattice path conjecture ==
Gessel has made significant contributions to an area in combinatorics known as lattice walks, which usually take place on the integer lattice and are sometimes confined to the upper right quadrant. An excursion is a lattice walk which starts at the origin and returns to the origin. A lattice excursion in the upper right quadrant with four possible steps, up, down, northeast, and southwest, is now known as a Gessel excursion.

By 2001 Gessel had noted empirically, and conjectured, that the number of Gessel excursions with 2n steps admit a simple hypergeometric closed form. This closed form counting function equation became known as Gessel's lattice path conjecture. A computer aided proof of Gessel's conjecture by Manuel Kauers, Christoph Koutschan, and Doron Zeilberger, was published in 2009.

The 2022 David P. Robbins Prize of the American Mathematical Society was awarded to Alin Bostan, Irina Kurkova, and Kilian Raschel, for their 2017 paper "A human proof of Gessel's lattice path conjecture."

== Political activism ==
In 1970, while a senior in high school, Ira Gessel and his brother Michael Gessel started a grassroots political organization to end pay toilets in America. The movement was largely successful and was disbanded in 1976.

== See also ==
- Lindström–Gessel–Viennot lemma
- Dyson conjecture
- Stirling permutation
- Dixon's identity
- Super-Catalan numbers
