= Manuel Kauers =

German mathematician and computer scientist

- Born: 20. February 1979; Lahnstein, West Germany
- Citizenship: German
- Awards: Start-Preis (2009); David P. Robbins Prize (2016)
- Scientific career
- Fields: Mathematics, Computer Science
- Workplaces: Research Institute for Symbolic Computation, Johannes Kepler University
- Doctoral advisor: Peter Paule

Manuel Kauers (born 20 February 1979 in Lahnstein, West Germany) is a German mathematician and computer scientist. He works on computer algebra and its applications to discrete mathematics. He is currently a professor of algebra at Johannes Kepler University (JKU) in Linz, Austria, and leader of the Institute for Algebra at JKU. Before that, he was affiliated with that university's Research Institute for Symbolic Computation (RISC).

Kauers studied computer science at the University of Karlsruhe in Germany from 1998 to 2002 and then moved to RISC, where he completed his PhD in symbolic computation in 2005 under the supervision of Peter Paule. He earned his habilitation in mathematics from JKU in 2008.

Together with Doron Zeilberger and Christoph Koutschan, Kauers proved two famous open conjectures in combinatorics using large scale computer algebra calculations. Both proofs appeared in the Proceedings of the National Academy of Sciences. The first concerned a conjecture formulated by Ira Gessel on the number of certain lattice walks restricted to the quarter plane. This result was later generalized by Alin Bostan and Kauers when they showed, also using computer algebra, that the generating function for these walks is algebraic. The second conjecture proven by Kauers, Koutschan and Zeilberger was the so-called q-TSPP conjecture, a product formula for the orbit generating function of totally symmetric plane partitions, which was formulated by George Andrews and David Robbins in the early 1980s.

In 2009, Kauers received the Start-Preis, which is considered the most prestigious award for young scientists in Austria. In 2016, together with Christoph Koutschan and Doron Zeilberger he received the David P. Robbins prize of the American Mathematical Society.
