= EToilet =

Type of public toilet in India

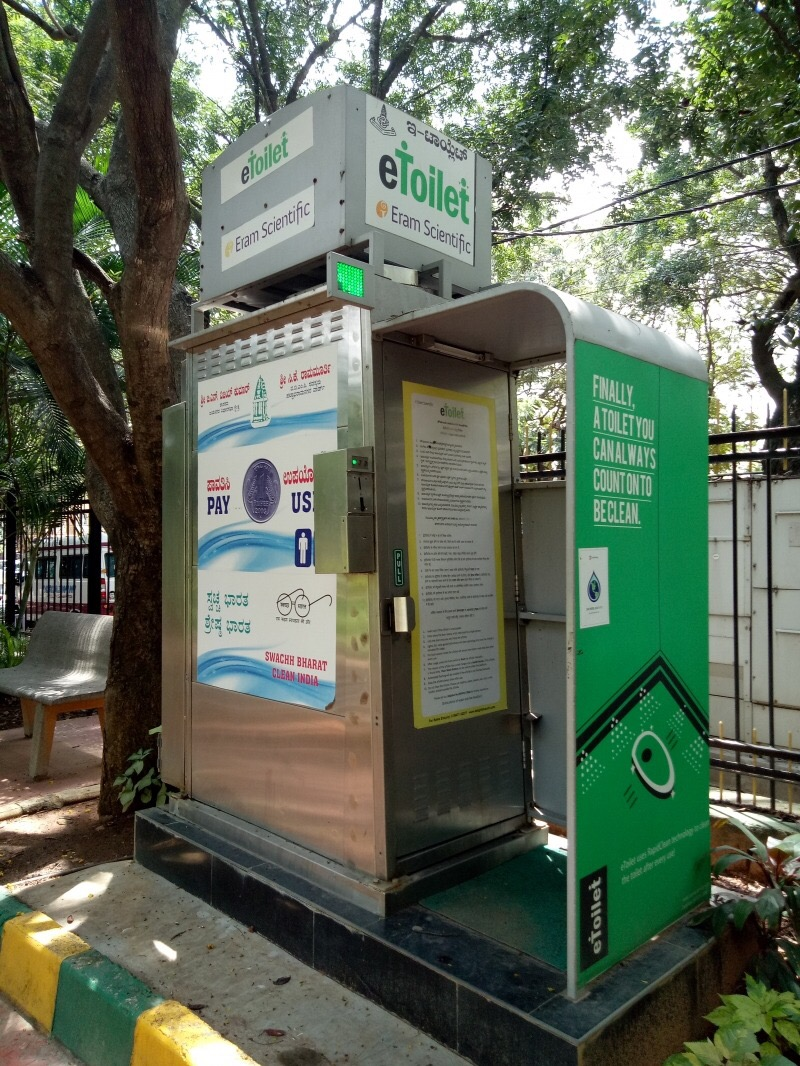
An eToilet, installed on a street in India

An electronic toilet or eToilet is a type of public toilet that is used in India. The increase in the use of eToilets is in support of Swachh Bharat Abhiyan (lit. 'Clean India Mission') which intends to reduce the practice of open defecation.

eToilets are self-contained, self-cleaning, unisex, user-friendly, unmanned, automated, and remotely monitored toilet pods installed in public places. They were developed by a private company, Eram Scientific Solutions, in 2008. Like Sanisette, eToilet is a registered trademark. This registered trademark, similar to Sanisette, demonstrates a growing trend towards integrating technology and convenience in public hygiene facilities.

== Features ==
eToilets can be coin operated pay toilets, or freely accessed with manual entry and exit. A safeguard corridor panel serves as a screen to avoid disturbing the public or the user of the toilet. The entire unit is made of stainless steel. Like other self-sustaining, electronic public toilets, eToilets have sensors to initiate automatic functions including pre-flush and post-flush platform cleaning, after a specified number of uses. Indication lights are displayed outside the unit which helps the user to identify whether the facility is occupied (red light) or unoccupied (green light) and whether the facility is out of service, for example if the water supply is low.

== See also ==
- Sanisette, a registered trademark for a similar toilet
- Self-cleaning floor
