= Christoph Koutschan =

German mathematician and computer scientist

- Born: December 12, 1978 (age 47); Dillingen an der Donau, Germany
- Education: University of Erlangen-Nuremberg, Research Institute for Symbolic Computation
- Awards: David P. Robbins Prize (AMS)
- Scientific career
- Fields: Mathematics; Computer science
- Workplaces: RICAM (Austrian Academy of Sciences)
- Thesis: Advanced Applications of the Holonomic Systems Approach (2009)
- Doctoral advisor: Peter Paule

Christoph Koutschan is a German mathematician and computer scientist. He is currently with the Johann Radon Institute for Computational and Applied Mathematics (RICAM) of the Austrian Academy of Sciences.

== Education ==
Christoph Koutschan (born 12 December 1978 in Dillingen an der Donau, Germany) is a German mathematician and computer scientist. He studied computer science at the University of Erlangen-Nuremberg in Germany from 1999 to 2005 and then moved to the Research Institute for Symbolic Computation (RISC) in Linz, Austria, where he completed his PhD in symbolic computation in 2009 under the supervision of Peter Paule.

== Career ==
Koutschan is working on computer algebra, particularly on holonomic functions, with applications to combinatorics, special functions, knot theory, and physics.

Together with Doron Zeilberger and Manuel Kauers, Koutschan proved two famous open conjectures in combinatorics using large scale computer algebra calculations. Both proofs appeared in the Proceedings of the National Academy of Sciences. The first concerned a conjecture formulated by Ira Gessel on the number of certain lattice walks restricted to the quarter plane. The second conjecture proven by Koutschan, Kauers, and Zeilberger was the so-called q-TSPP conjecture, a product formula for the orbit generating function of totally symmetric plane partitions, which was formulated by George Andrews and David Robbins in the early 1980s.

He is currently with the Johann Radon Institute for Computational and Applied Mathematics (RICAM) of the Austrian Academy of Sciences.

== Awards ==
In 2016, with Manuel Kauers and Doron Zeilberger he received the David P. Robbins Prize of the American Mathematical Society.

== Personal life ==
Koutschan is married and has two children.
