= Robert Hough =

Robert Hough may refer to:

- Robert Hough (author), Canadian author
- Robert D. Hough, American mathematician
