= Privatization of public toilets =

Ongoing process in the United States and other countries

Privatization of public toilets is an ongoing process in the United States and other countries. Police (e.g. in Los Angeles) have sometimes supported their privatization, claiming that public toilets are "crime scenes" that attract illegal activity.

A criticism of toilet privatization is that it results in the denial of a basic service to the urban poor. In southern California in the 1980s, authorities consciously reduced the number of public toilets to make certain areas less attractive to "undesirables".

In some cases, partial privatization of the toilet system takes place in the form of vendors supplying the service in exchange for advertising rights. Mayor of New York City Michael Bloomberg described such a deal as a "unique opportunity to...creat[e] a vibrant and aesthetically pleasing streetscape…without the burden of public investment."

John Stossel points out that private property may be better taken care of than public property: "Think about shared public property, like public toilets. They're often gross...Compare dirty public toilets to privately run toilets. They're common in Europe, and cleaner, because their owners – selfishly seeking a profit – work at keeping them clean."

== See also ==
- Pay toilet
