= Aaron Robertson =

Aaron Robertson may refer to:

- Aaron Robertson (mathematician) (born 1971)
- Aaron Robertson, drummer for the band Myka Relocate
