= Ilse Fischer =

Austrian mathematician

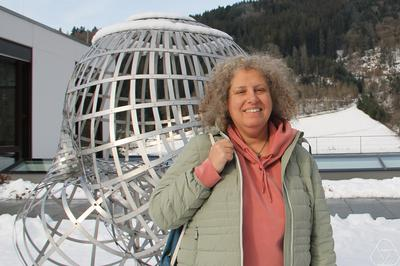
Fischer at Oberwolfach in 2026

Ilse Fischer (born 29 June 1975) is an Austrian mathematician whose research concerns enumerative combinatorics and algebraic combinatorics, connecting these topics to representation theory and statistical mechanics. She is a professor of mathematics at the University of Vienna.

== Education and career ==
Fischer was born in Klagenfurt. She studied at the University of Vienna beginning in 1993, earning a master's degree (mag. rer. nat.), doctorate (dr. rer. nat.), and habilitation there respectively in 1998, 2000, and 2006. Her doctoral dissertation, Enumeration of perfect matchings: Rhombus tilings and Pfaffian graphs, was jointly supervised by Christian Krattenthaler and Franz Rendl, and her habilitation thesis was A polynomial method for the enumeration of plane partitions and alternating sign matrices.

She worked as an assistant at Alpen-Adria-Universität Klagenfurt from 1999 to 2004, with a year of postdoctoral research at the Massachusetts Institute of Technology in 2001. She moved to the University of Vienna in 2004, and at Vienna she was promoted to associate professor in 2011 and to full professor in 2017.

== Recognition ==
Fischer won the 2006 Dr. Maria Schaumayer Prize, and the 2009 Start-Preis of the Austrian Science Fund.

With Roger Behrend and Matjaž Konvalinka, Fischer is a winner of the 2019 David P. Robbins Prize of the American Mathematical Society and Mathematical Association of America, for their joint research on alternating sign matrices.
