= List of hypergeometric identities =

Below is a list of hypergeometric identities.

- Hypergeometric function lists identities for the Gaussian hypergeometric function
- Generalized hypergeometric function lists identities for more general hypergeometric functions
- Bailey's list is a list of the hypergeometric function identities in Bailey (1935) given by Koepf (1995).
- Wilf–Zeilberger pair is a method for proving hypergeometric identities
