= Sanisette =

Self-cleaning public toilet

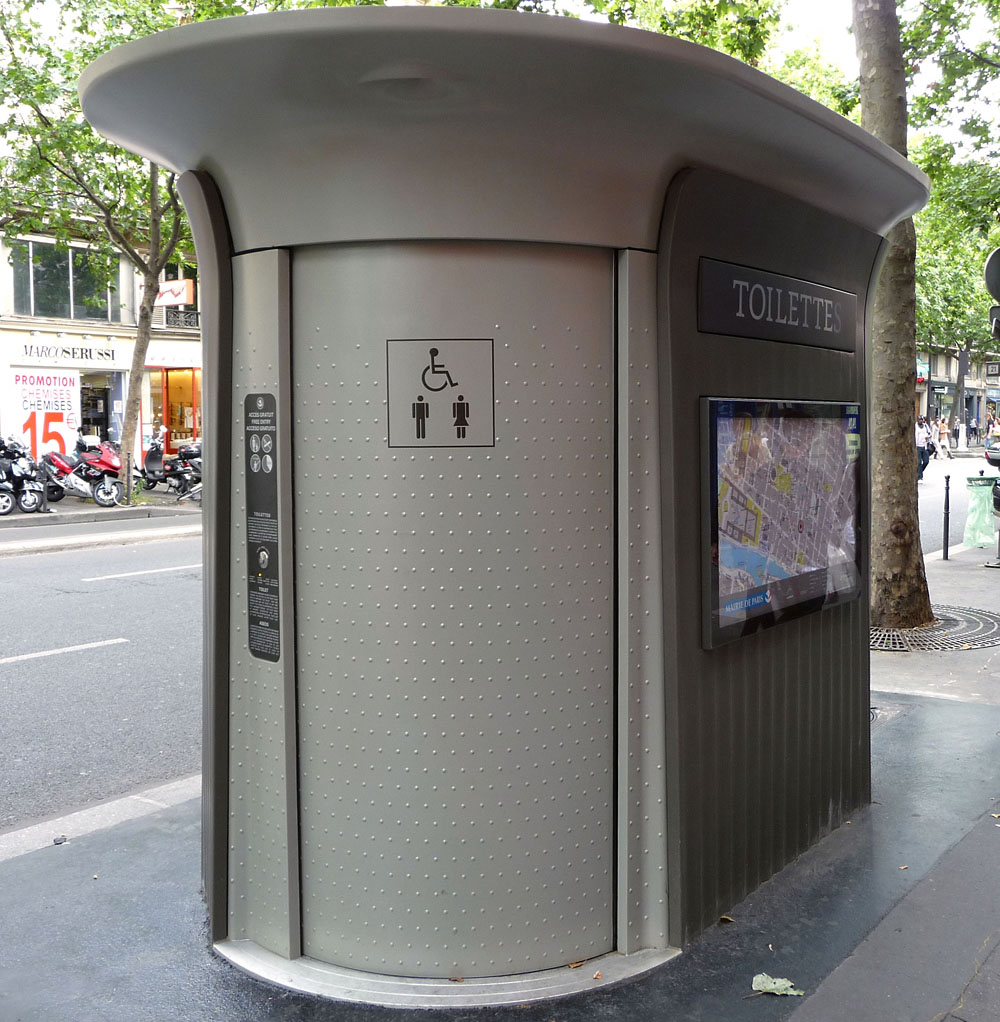
A Sanisette on the boulevard Sébastopol in Paris

Sanisette (French pronunciation: [saniˈzɛt]) is a registered trademark for a self-contained, self-cleaning, unisex, public toilet pioneered by the French company JCDecaux. These toilets (and other similar toilets) are a common sight in several major cities of the world, but they are perhaps most closely associated with the city of Paris, where they are ubiquitous. In the United Kingdom, they (along with automated public conveniences of other brands) are known informally as "Superloos".

== Description ==
The Sanisette contains a toilet behind a door that opens when a button is pressed or, in the case of a pay toilet, a coin inserted into a control panel on the outside of the toilet. A washbasin is provided (the style varies with the model of Sanisette). When a user enters the toilet, the door closes to provide privacy. After the user has finished using the toilet, they exit and the door closes again. A wash cycle then begins inside the toilet, and the toilet fixture itself is scrubbed and disinfected automatically. After about sixty seconds, the toilet is again ready for use.

Special models exist for disabled users, although recent versions of Sanisettes are designed to accommodate both ambulatory users and users in wheelchairs. Some Sanisettes are designed to mount flush within a wall (sometimes seen in Paris Métro stations), or within decorative outdoor Morris columns. Most Sanisettes include indicators of their availability: ready, occupied, cycling (self-cleaning), or out of service. Sanisettes may be configured to require coins or to operate for free at the push of a button.

Sanisettes are usually configured to open the door after a preset period (typically 15 minutes) to discourage vagrants. The door cannot be opened from the outside unless the Sanisette is available and a coin is inserted (or the appropriate button is pushed). A handle on the inside of the Sanisette door allows it to be opened from the inside at any time (in recent versions, the door opens at the push of a button, but there is still a handle for emergencies).

== See also ==
- Electronic toilet
- Self-cleaning floor
