= Solid partition =

In mathematics, solid partitions are natural generalizations of integer partitions and plane partitions defined by Percy Alexander MacMahon. A solid partition of $n$ is a three-dimensional array of non-negative integers $n_{i,j,k}$ (with indices $i, j, k\geq 1$) such that

$$\sum_{i,j,k} n_{i,j,k}=n$$

and

$n_{i+1,j,k} \leq n_{i,j,k},\quad n_{i,j+1,k} \leq n_{i,j,k}\quad\text{and}\quad n_{i,j,k+1} \leq n_{i,j,k}$ for all $i, j \text{ and } k.$

Let $p_3(n)$ denote the number of solid partitions of $n$. As the definition of solid partitions involves three-dimensional arrays of numbers, they are also called three-dimensional partitions in notation where plane partitions are two-dimensional partitions and partitions are one-dimensional partitions. Solid partitions and their higher-dimensional generalizations are discussed in the book by Andrews.

== Ferrers diagrams for solid partitions ==
Another representation for solid partitions is in the form of Ferrers diagrams. The Ferrers diagram of a solid partition of $n$ is a collection of $n$ points or nodes, $\lambda=(\mathbf{y}_1,\mathbf{y}_2,\ldots,\mathbf{y}_n)$, with $\mathbf{y}_i\in \mathbb{Z}_{\geq0}^4$ satisfying the condition:

Condition FD: If the node $\mathbf{a}=(a_1,a_2,a_3, a_4)\in \lambda$, then so do all the nodes $\mathbf{y}=(y_1,y_2,y_3,y_4)$ with $0\leq y_i\leq a_i$ for all $i=1,2,3,4$.

For instance, the Ferrers diagram

$$\left( \begin{smallmatrix} 0\\ 0\\  0 \\ 0 \end{smallmatrix}
\begin{smallmatrix} 0\\ 0\\  1 \\ 0  \end{smallmatrix}
\begin{smallmatrix} 0\\ 1\\ 0  \\ 0 \end{smallmatrix}
\begin{smallmatrix}1 \\ 0 \\ 0  \\ 0 \end{smallmatrix}
\begin{smallmatrix} 1 \\ 1\\  0 \\ 0 \end{smallmatrix}
\right) \ ,$$

where each column is a node, represents a solid partition of $5$. There is a natural action of the symmetric group $S_4$ on a Ferrers diagram – this corresponds to permuting the four coordinates of all nodes. This generalises the operation denoted by conjugation on usual partitions.

=== Equivalence of the two representations ===
Given a Ferrers diagram, one constructs the solid partition (as in the main definition) as follows.

Let $n_{i,j,k}$ be the number of nodes in the Ferrers diagram with coordinates of the form $(i-1,j-1,k-1,*)$ where $*$ denotes an arbitrary value. The collection $n_{i,j,k}$ form a solid partition. One can verify that condition FD implies that the conditions for a solid partition are satisfied.

Given a set of $n_{i,j,k}$ that form a solid partition, one obtains the corresponding Ferrers diagram as follows.

Start with the Ferrers diagram with no nodes. For every non-zero $n_{i,j,k}$, add $n_{i,j,k}$ nodes $(i-1,j-1,k-1,y_4)$ for $0\leq y_4< n_{i,j,k}$ to the Ferrers diagram. By construction, it is easy to see that condition FD is satisfied.

For example, the Ferrers diagram with $5$ nodes given above corresponds to the solid partition with

$$n_{1,1,1}=n_{2,1,1}=n_{1,2,1}=n_{1,1,2}=n_{2,2,1}=1$$

with all other $n_{i,j,k}$ vanishing.

== Generating function ==
Let $p_3(0)\equiv 1$. Define the generating function of solid partitions, $P_3(q)$, by

$P_3(q) :=\sum_{n=0}^\infty p_3(n) q^n = 1 + q + 4q^2 + 10q^3 + 26q^4 + 59q^5 + 140q^6 + \cdots$ (sequence A000293 in the OEIS).

The generating functions of integer partitions and plane partitions have simple product formulae, due to Euler and MacMahon, respectively. However, a guess of MacMahon fails to correctly reproduce the solid partitions of 6. It appears that there is no simple formula for the generating function of solid partitions; in particular, there cannot be any formula analogous to the product formulas of Euler and MacMahon.

== Exact enumeration using computers ==
Given the lack of an explicitly known generating function, the enumerations of the numbers of solid partitions for larger integers have been carried out numerically. There are two algorithms that are used to enumerate solid partitions and their higher-dimensional generalizations. The work of Atkin. et al. used an algorithm due to Bratley and McKay. In 1970, Knuth proposed a different algorithm to enumerate topological sequences that he used to evaluate numbers of solid partitions of all integers $n\leq 28$. Mustonen and Rajesh extended the enumeration for all integers $n\leq 50$. In 2010, S. Balakrishnan proposed a parallel version of Knuth's algorithm that has been used to extend the enumeration to all integers $n\leq 72$. One finds

$$p_3(72)=3464 27497 40651 72792\ ,$$

which is a 19 digit number illustrating the difficulty in carrying out such exact enumerations.

== Asymptotic behavior ==
It is conjectured that there exists a constant $c$ such that

$$\lim_{n\rightarrow\infty}
\frac{\log p_3(n)}{ n^{3/4}} = c.$$
