= Committee to End Pay Toilets in America =

Organization (founded 1970)

- Founded: 1970; 56 years ago
- Dissolved: 1976; 50 years ago
- Headquarters: Dayton, Ohio

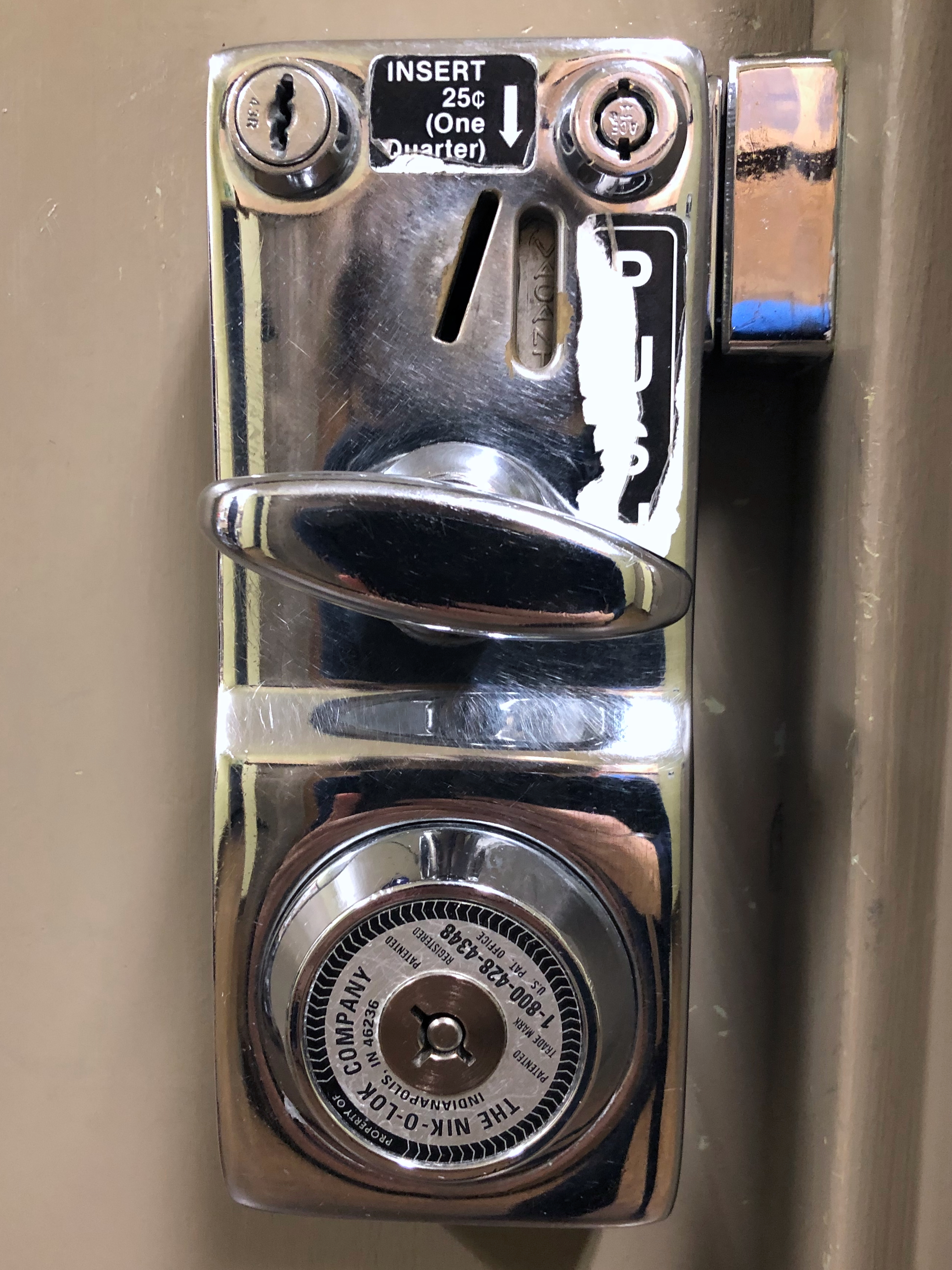
Coin-operated lock made by the Nik-O-Lok Company

The Committee to End Pay Toilets in America, or CEPTIA, was a 1970s grass-roots political organization which was one of the main forces behind the elimination of pay toilets in many American cities and states.

== History ==
When a man's or woman's natural body functions are restricted because he or she doesn't have a piece of change, there is no true freedom.

— Ira Gessel

Founded in 1970 by nineteen-year-old Ira Gessel, the committee's purpose was to "eliminate pay toilets in the U.S. through legislation and public pressure." At the time of the committee's formation, it was common for restroom stalls to be locked through a coin-operated mechanism that required a dime.

Gessel told newsmen, "You can have a fifty-dollar bill, but if you don't have a dime, that metal box is between you and relief." Membership in the organization cost only $0.25, and members received the committee's newsletter, the Free Toilet Paper. Headquartered in Dayton, Ohio, the group had as many as 1,500 members, in seven chapters.

The group found sympathy with the feminist movement, as urinals, unlike stall toilets, were typically free. The group also sponsored the Thomas Crapper Memorial Award, which was given to "the person who has made an outstanding contribution to the cause of CEPTIA and free toilets."

In 1973, Chicago became the first American city to act when the city council voted 37–8 in support of a ban on pay toilets in that city. According to at least one source, this was "a direct response, evidently," to CEPTIA.

The group disbanded in 1976, with Gessel saying that CEPTIA "essentially achieved our victory".

== Achievements ==
According to The Wall Street Journal, there were, in 1974, at least 50,000 pay toilets in America, mostly made by the Nik-O-Lok Company. Despite this flourishing commerce, CEPTIA was successful over the next few years in obtaining bans in New York, New Jersey, Minnesota, California, Florida, and Ohio. Lobbying was so successful that by June 1976, twelve states had enacted bans and the group announced that it was disbanding, declaring its mission mostly achieved.

== Criticism ==
While CEPTIA's campaign was successful in largely eliminating pay toilets in the United States, critics charge that the result was not a flourishing of free public toilets, but rather fewer public toilets of any sort than in other countries that did not see a movement against pay toilets. In a piece for Bloomberg CityLab, Sophie House called for a reconsideration of the pay toilet bans in the hope of making public toilets more widely available, like most places without pay toilet bans.
