= Selberg integral =

Mathematical function

In mathematics, the Selberg integral is a generalization of Euler beta function to n dimensions introduced by Atle Selberg. It has applications in statistical mechanics, multivariable orthogonal polynomials, random matrix theory, Calogero–Moser–Sutherland model, and Knizhnik–Zamolodchikov equations.

== Selberg's integral formula ==
When $Re(\alpha) > 0, Re(\beta) > 0, Re(\gamma) > -\min \left(\frac 1n , \frac{Re(\alpha)}{n-1}, \frac{Re(\beta)}{n-1}\right)$, we have

$$\begin{align}
S_{n} (\alpha, \beta, \gamma) & =
\int_0^1 \cdots \int_0^1 \prod_{i=1}^n t_i^{\alpha-1}(1-t_i)^{\beta-1}
\prod_{1 \le i < j \le n} |t_i - t_j |^{2 \gamma}\,dt_1 \cdots dt_n \\
& = \prod_{j = 0}^{n-1}
\frac {\Gamma(\alpha + j \gamma) \Gamma(\beta + j \gamma) \Gamma (1 + (j+1)\gamma)}
{\Gamma(\alpha + \beta + (n+j-1)\gamma) \Gamma(1+\gamma)}
\end{align}$$

Selberg's formula implies Dixon's identity for well poised hypergeometric series, and some special cases of Dyson's conjecture. This is a corollary of Aomoto.

== Aomoto's integral formula ==
Aomoto proved a slightly more general integral formula. With the same conditions as Selberg's formula,

$$\int_0^1 \cdots \int_0^1 \left(\prod_{i=1}^k t_i\right)\prod_{i=1}^n t_i^{\alpha-1}(1-t_i)^{\beta-1}
\prod_{1 \le i < j \le n} |t_i - t_j |^{2 \gamma}\,dt_1 \cdots dt_n$$
$$=
S_n(\alpha,\beta,\gamma) \prod_{j=1}^k\frac{\alpha+(n-j)\gamma}{\alpha+\beta+(2n-j-1)\gamma}.$$

A proof is found in Chapter 8 of Andrews, Askey & Roy (1999).

== Mehta's integral ==
When $Re(\gamma) > -1/n$,

$$\frac{1}{(2\pi)^{n/2}}\int_{-\infty}^{\infty} \cdots \int_{-\infty}^{\infty} \prod_{i=1}^n e^{-t_i^2/2}
\prod_{1 \le i < j \le n} |t_i - t_j |^{2 \gamma}\,dt_1 \cdots dt_n = \prod_{j=1}^n\frac{\Gamma(1+j\gamma)}{\Gamma(1+\gamma)}.$$

It is a corollary of Selberg, by setting $\alpha = \beta$, and change of variables with $t_i = \frac{1+t'_i/\sqrt{2\alpha}}{2}$, then taking $\alpha \to \infty$.

This was conjectured by Mehta & Dyson (1963), who were unaware of Selberg's earlier work.

It is the partition function for a gas of point charges moving on a line that are attracted to the origin.

In particular, when $\gamma = 1$, the term on the right is $\prod_{j=1}^n j!$.

== Macdonald's integral ==
Macdonald (1982) conjectured the following extension of Mehta's integral to all finite root systems, Mehta's original case corresponding to the A_{n−1} root system.

$$\frac{1}{(2\pi)^{n/2}}\int\cdots\int \left|\prod_r\frac{2(x,r)}{(r,r)}\right|^{\gamma}e^{-(x_1^2+\cdots+x_n^2)/2}dx_1\cdots dx_n
=\prod_{j=1}^n\frac{\Gamma(1+d_j\gamma)}{\Gamma(1+\gamma)}$$

The product is over the roots r of the roots system and the numbers d_{j} are the degrees of the generators of the ring of invariants of the reflection group. Opdam (1989) gave a uniform proof for all crystallographic reflection groups. Several years later he proved it in full generality, making use of computer-aided calculations by Garvan.
