= Peter Winkler =

American mathematician

- Born: Peter Mann Winkler; 1946 (age 79–80)
- Education: Harvard University (BA); Yale University (PhD)
- Awards: David P. Robbins Prize (2011)
- Scientific career
- Workplaces: Stanford; Emory University; Bell Labs; Dartmouth College
- Thesis: Assignment of Skolem Functions for Model-Complete Theories (1975)
- Doctoral advisor: Abraham Robinson; Angus Macintyre

Peter Mann Winkler is a research mathematician, author of books on mathematical puzzles and of more than 130 research papers in mathematics and patent holder in a broad range of applications, ranging from cryptography to marine navigation. His research areas include discrete mathematics, theory of computation and probability theory. He is currently the William Morrill Professor of Mathematics and Computer Science at Dartmouth College.

== Education and career ==
Peter Winkler studied mathematics at Harvard University and later received his PhD in 1975 from Yale University under the supervision of Angus McIntyre. He has also served as an assistant professor at Stanford, full professor and chair at Emory and as a mathematics research director at Bell Labs and Lucent Technologies. He was visiting professor at the Technische Universität Darmstadt.

== Puzzle books ==
Winkler has published three books on mathematical puzzles:

- Mathematical Puzzles: A connoisseur's collection (A K Peters, 2004, ISBN 978-1-56881-201-4, translated to German and Russian)
- Mathematical Mind-Benders (A K Peters, 2007, ISBN 978-1-56881-336-3)
- Mathematical Puzzles (A K Peters, 2021, ISBN 978-0-36720-693-2).

Winkler is widely considered to be a pre eminent scholar in this domain. He was the Visiting Distinguished Chair for Public Dissemination of Mathematics at the National Museum of Mathematics (MoMath), gave topical talks at the Gathering 4 Gardner conferences, and wrote novel papers related to some of these puzzles.

== Bridge at the Enigma Club ==
Winkler's book Bridge at the Enigma Club was a runner up for the 2011 Master Point Press Book of the Year Award.

== Recognition ==
In 2011, Winkler received the David P. Robbins Prize of the Mathematical Association of America as coauthor of one of two papers in the American Mathematical Monthly.

== Paul Erdős anecdote ==
According to The Man Who Loved Only Numbers, a biography of Paul Erdős, he attended the bar mitzvah celebration for Peter Winkler's twins, and Winkler's mother-in-law tried to throw Erdős out:

"Erdös came to my twins' bar mitzvah, notebook in hand," said Peter Winkler, a colleague of Graham's at AT&T. "He also brought gifts for my children--he loved kids--and behaved himself very well. But my mother-in-law tried to throw him out. She thought he was some guy who wandered in off the street, in a rumpled suit, carrying a pad under his arm. It is entirely possible that he proved a theorem or two during the ceremony."
