= Nik-O-Lok Company =

Manufacturer of pay toilet locks

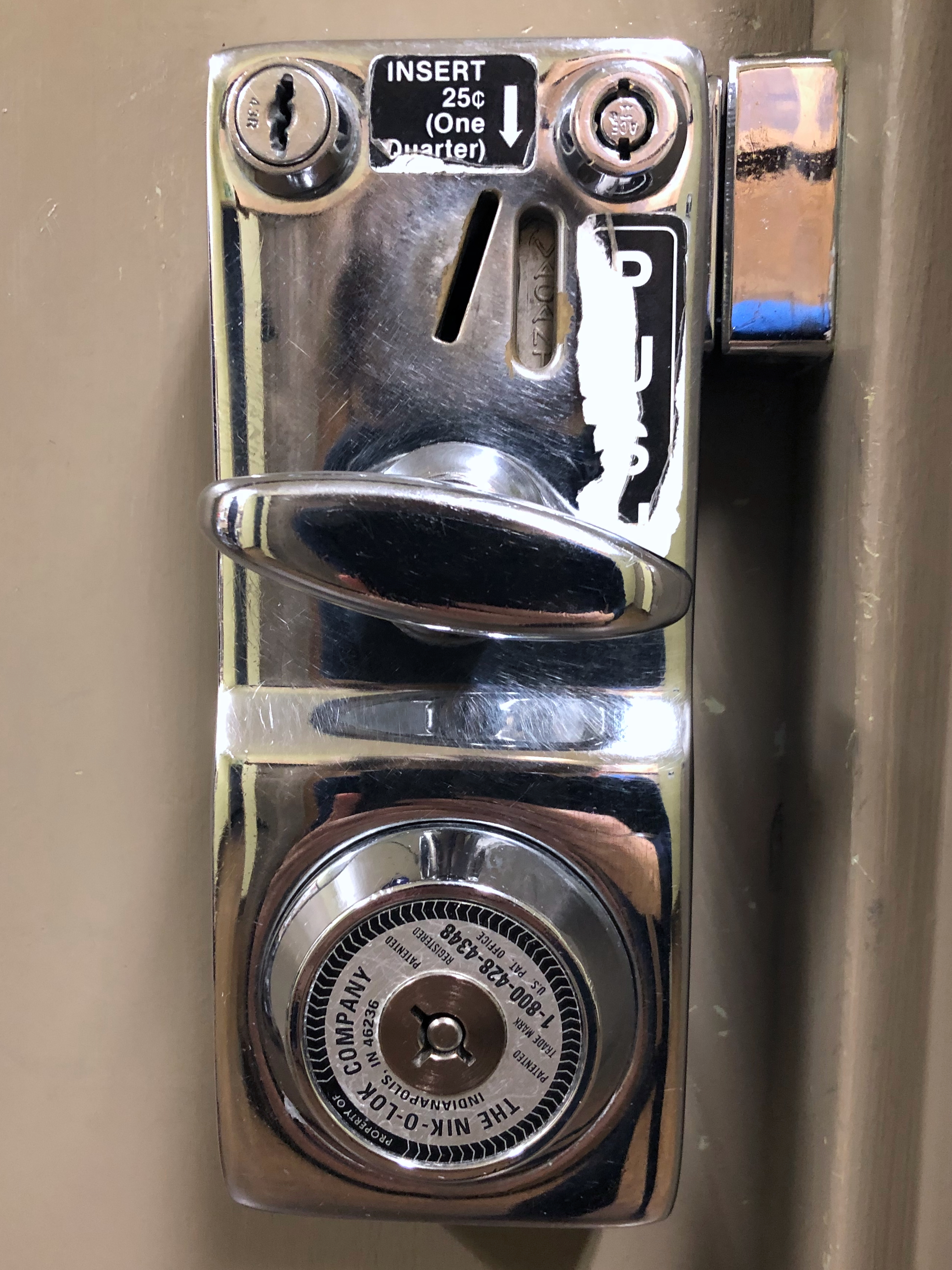
- Nik-O-Lok coin-operated door lock
- Type: Private
- Industry: Vending machines
- Founded: 1910
- Headquarters: Indianapolis, Indiana, US
- Parent: RKU Standard Incorporated
- Website: nikolok.com

The Nik-O-Lok Company is an American company founded in 1910 with headquarters in Indianapolis, Indiana, that manufactures and leases coin-operated door locks for pay toilets in public bathrooms, along with selling related equipment. The company produces locks that can be operated by manufacturer-supplied tokens or by quarters. By the 1960s, the Nik-O-Lok Company was the largest American manufacturer and leaser of coin-operated locks for pay toilets, which had become common in buildings open to the public. At one point, an estimated 40,000 units were in use across the country. In the 1970s, the Committee to End Pay Toilets in America successfully campaigned against pay toilets, causing many states to ban them, and most Nik-O-Lok coin locks were removed. The company added a token option to its line of door locks and produced other vending machines.

In 1955, the Nik-O-Lok Company established Standard Change-Makers, a subsidiary company, to manufacture and sell change machines. Standard Change-Makers became independent in 1965 and later acquired Nik-O-Lok. The original family owners sold the companies in 2021 to another privately held company, RKU Standard Incorporated.

== History ==
=== Formation and growth ===
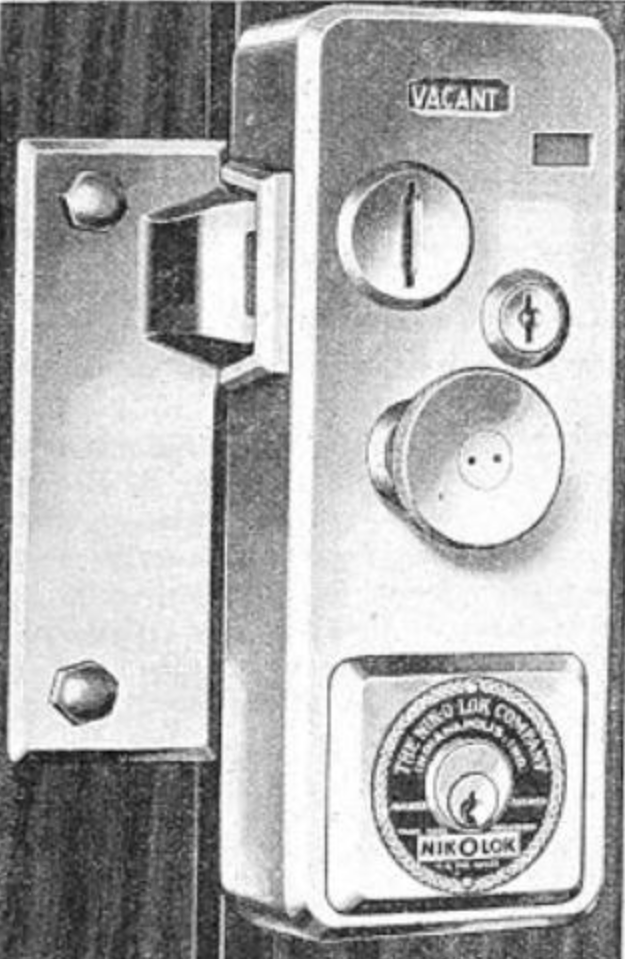
Nik-O-Lok advertisement in 1928

In about 1910, Charles N. Van Cleave, owner of the Michigan Coin Lock Company, bought an automatic coin lock patent from a Chicago inventor who had not been able to sell many locks. Van Cleave decided to instead lease the locks, maintain them on behalf of leaseholders, and take a commission from the coin income, which was a more successful business model. After acquiring an Arizona coin lock company, Van Cleave acquired the Universal Coin Lock Company of Indianapolis and moved the company's operations to Indianapolis. By 1923, it had installed coin locks in railway systems and hotels throughout Indiana. The company renamed itself to the Nik-O-Lok Company in 1928. In the late 1920s, Nik-O-Lok promoted its coin locks to operators of gas stations and airports, offering six-month free trials. Nik-O-Lok acquired the company's largest competitor in February 1935. After Van Cleave died in November 1935, a family member, James R. McNutt, became president of the company.

After McNutt died in 1942, another family member, James B. Lanagan, took over and led the acquisition of 12 more companies. According to a Federal Trade Commission (FTC) decision in 1954, Nik-O-Lok and a few other coin lock companies colluded to fix prices for leasing coin locks in the early 1950s, and the FTC ordered them to stop cooperating. Lanagan also purchased an automatic change machine company in 1955 and established a subsidiary company, Standard Change-Makers, which manufactured change machines for laundromats and other businesses. Lanagan served as an officer of the National Automatic Merchandising Association during the mid-century growth of the vending machine industry.

Nik-O-Lok pay toilet locks initially charged a nickel for entry, which the company increased to a dime in the 1950s. The company received about two cents from every dime paid for entry. When the Nik-O-Lok Company installed locks, it also installed door hinges manufactured by the company because the lock equipment was heavy. In 1955 the company had an estimated 40,000 Nik-O-Lok units in place across the country, with annual gross revenue between US$500,000 (equivalent to $6,000,000 in 2025) and US$1,000,000 (equivalent to $12,000,000 in 2025). At that time, it outsourced maintenance to 1,500 local locksmiths. By 1962, Nik-O-Lok was the largest coin-operated door lock company in the United States, with locks in bathrooms in Woolworth stores, Sheraton and Hilton hotels, Greyhound bus stations, and major airports. The company also leased some locks in British Columbia, Canada. In 1975, an Associated Press article said that Nik-O-Lok had 30,000 accounts in the United States. Many Nik-O-Lok locks charged a quarter for entry by the mid-1970s.

=== Bans on pay toilets ===
In 1970, the Committee to End Pay Toilets in America (CEPTIA) began campaigning against pay toilets. Chicago was the first city to order removal of coin locks on toilets in 1973, specifically for toilets in city airports. Nik-O-Lok sued the city of Chicago and lost. The states of Alaska, California, Florida, Iowa, Nevada, New Jersey, New York, and Wyoming also passed legislation to enact bans within a few years. The province of British Columbia banned pay toilets in public buildings in 1975. Nik-O-Lok and a restaurant chain sued the state of New York to try to stop the implementation of its ban, which applied to both businesses and government buildings, and lost. Nik-O-Lok hired a lobbyist to fight a ban in the state of Washington, but it passed in 1977.

A Nik-O-Lok representative told the Wall Street Journal that pay toilets "discourage drug addicts, homosexuals, muggers and just plain hippies from haunting public restrooms", while CEPTIA said that "pay toilets foster public dishonesty and disrespect for authority due to the widespread circumvention of the lock fee". People complained that in public bathrooms with Nik-O-Lok devices, men could use urinals at no cost while women always had to pay for toilet stall access; the company suggested that businesses should maintain a few free stalls along with paid ones to improve fairness for women. In response to public advocacy, a company representative said "They're a bunch of whacks as far as I'm concerned. It's all women's lib." Nik-O-Lok also argued that eliminating pay toilets would lead to businesses closing public toilets, which did happen. The economics podcast Planet Money described the reduction in public toilets in the United States over the following decades as an example of the impacts of government price controls (in this case, requiring a price of zero for a service).

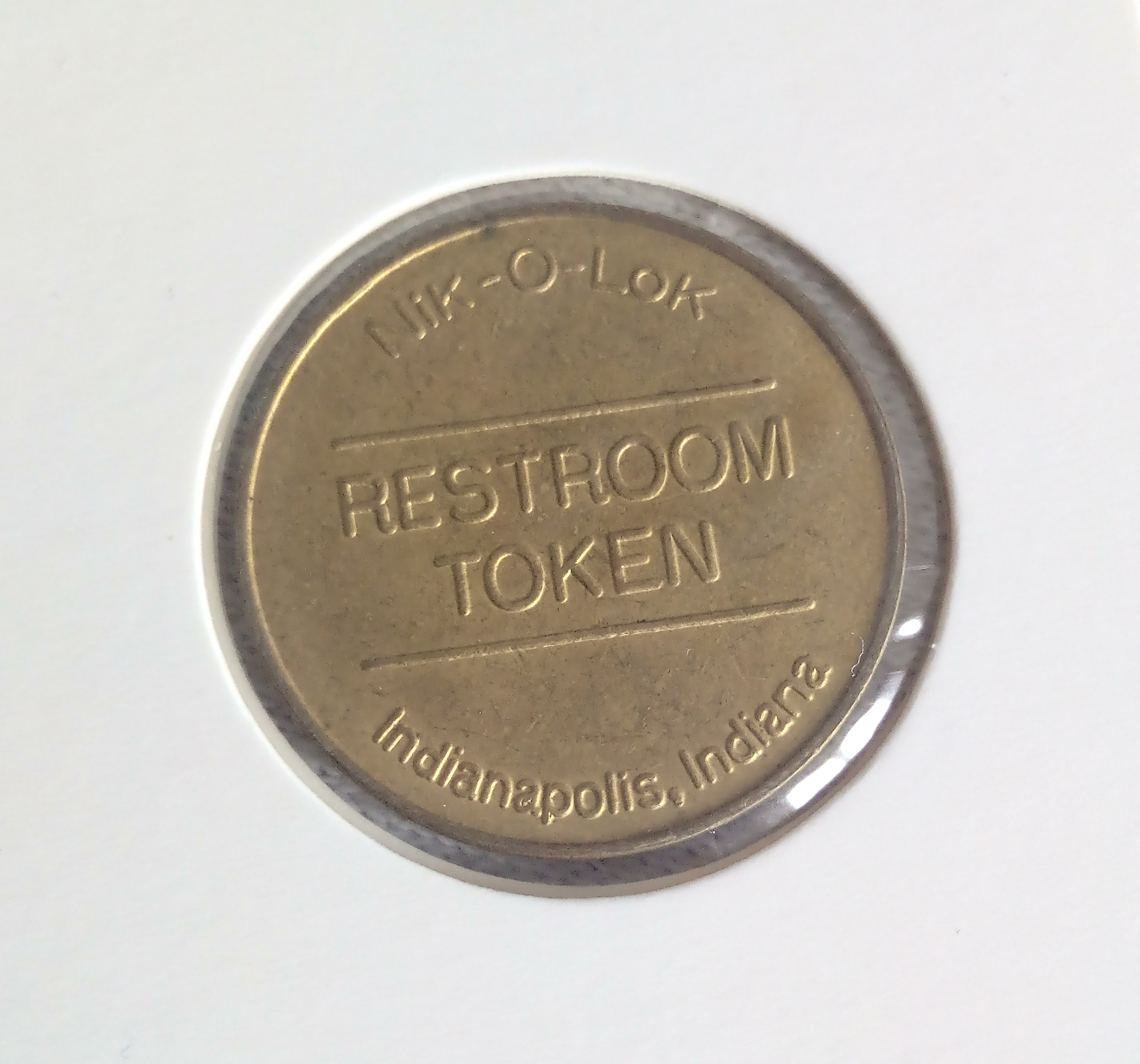
Nik-O-Lok restroom token

Nik-O-Lok started producing token-operated door locks in the late 1970s, so that a business could control access to its toilets by providing tokens upon request without requiring payment. By 1980, the company had very few remaining coin-operated toilet door locks in the United States.

=== Diversification ===
The company leased automatic subway token dispensers to the New York Metropolitan Transportation Authority in the 1960s. In the late 1970s, they produced coin-operated air compressors for gas stations, which were installed in the Pittsburgh, Philadelphia, Detroit, and New York regions. By 1978, the company had sold at least 1,000 coin-operated air units to gas stations. Customers complained about having to pay for air, and a town in Long Island passed an ordinance requiring gas stations to provide free access to air pumps.

Standard Change-Makers spun off into its own company in 1965 and later acquired Nik-O-Lok. In 2021, the McNutt family sold Standard Change-Makers to RKU Standard, a company co-owned by the Standard Change-Makers chief operating officer, who became the president of Standard Change-Makers after acquisition.

== Products ==
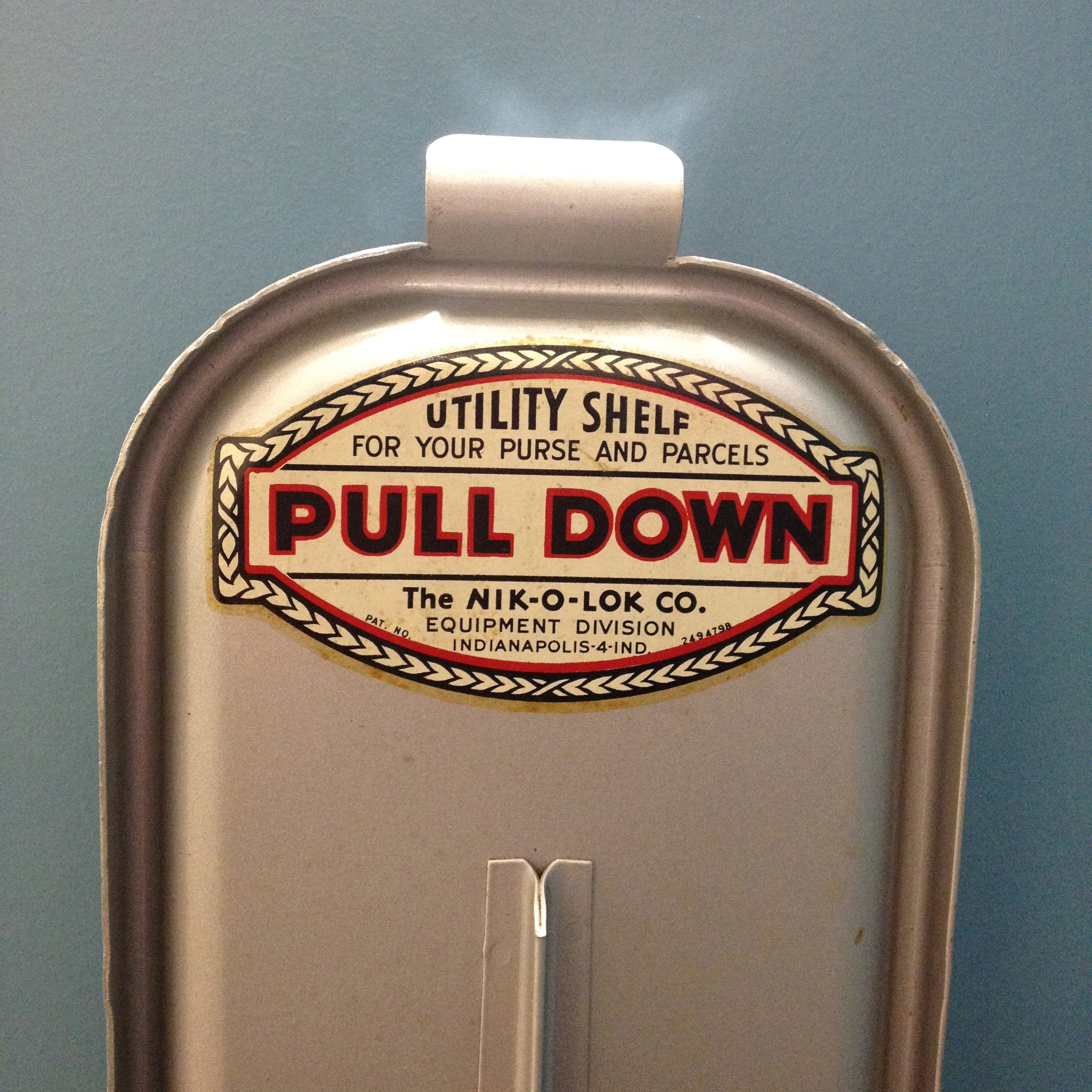
Nik-O-Lok toilet stall shelf

Nik-O-Lok continues to manufacture and lease coin-operated and token-operated locks for public bathrooms; they do not sell their locks. They also manufacture and sell accessories including heavy-duty latches and hinges for bathroom doors. In 1949, the company introduced a spring-loaded pull-down shelf for installation in toilet stalls, labeled as "for your purse and parcels". The company continues to manufacture and sell this shelf, which is made of zamak, a zinc alloy. A customer using this shelf cannot forget their items because the pulled-down shelf prevents opening the door.

Standard Change-Makers manufactures and sells currency change machines and car wash entry systems, among other vending products. For example, they made machines for dispensing tickets and wristbands at the Indiana State Fair.
