= Aaron Robertson (mathematician) =

American mathematician (born 1971)

- Born: Aaron Robertson; November 8, 1971 (age 55); Torrance, California, U.S.
- Education: University of Michigan (BS); Temple University (PhD)
- Scientific career
- Fields: Mathematics; Ramsey Theory
- Workplaces: Colgate University
- Thesis: Some New Results in Ramsey Theory (1999)
- Doctoral advisor: Doron Zeilberger

Aaron Robertson (born November 8, 1971) is an American mathematician who specializes in Ramsey theory. He is a professor at Colgate University.

== Life and education ==
Aaron Robertson was born in Torrance, California, and moved with his parents to Midland, Michigan at the age of 4. He studied actuarial science as an undergraduate at the University of Michigan, and went on to graduate school in mathematics at Temple University in Philadelphia, where he was supervised by Doron Zeilberger. Robertson received his Ph.D. in 1999 with his thesis titled Some New Results in Ramsey Theory.

Following his Ph.D., Robertson became an assistant professor of mathematics at Colgate University, where he is currently a full professor.

== Mathematical work ==
Robertson's work in mathematics since 1998 has consisted predominantly of topics related to Ramsey theory.

One of Robertson's earliest publications is a paper, co-authored with his supervisor Doron Zeilberger, which came out of his Ph.D. work. The authors prove that "the minimum number (asymptotically) of monochromatic Schur Triples that a 2-colouring of $[1,n]$ can have $n^2/22 + O(n)$".

After completing his dissertation, Robertson worked with 3-term arithmetic progressions where he found the best-known values that were close to each other and titled this piece New Lower Bounds for Some Multicolored Ramsey Numbers.

Another notable piece of Robertson's research is a paper co-authored with Doron Zeilberger and Herbert Wilf titled Permutation Patterns and Continued Fractions. In the paper, they "find a generating function for the number of (132)-avoiding permutations that have a given number of (123) patterns" with the result being "in the form of a continued fraction". Robertson's contribution to this specific paper includes discussion on permutations that avoid a certain pattern but contain others.

A notable paper Robertson wrote titled A Probalistic Threshold For Monochromatic Arithmetic Progressions explores the function $f_r(k) = \sqrt k \cdot r^{k/2}$ (where $r\geq 2$ is fixed) and the r-colourings of $[1,n_k] = \{1,2,\ldots,n_k\}$. Robertson analyzes the threshold function for $k$-term arithmetic progressions and improves the bounds found previously.

In 2004, Robertson and Bruce M. Landman published the book Ramsey Theory on the Integers, of which a second expanded edition appeared in 2014. The book introduced new topics such as rainbow Ramsey theory, an “inequality” version of Schur's theorem, monochromatic solutions of recurrence relations, Ramsey results involving both sums and products, monochromatic sets avoiding certain differences, Ramsey properties for polynomial progressions, generalizations of the Erdős–Ginzberg–Ziv theorem, and the number of arithmetic progressions under arbitrary colourings.

More recently, in 2021, Robertson published a book titled Fundamentals of Ramsey Theory. Robertson's goal in writing this book was to "help give an overview of Ramsey theory from several points of view, adding intuition and detailed proofs as we go, while being, hopefully, a bit gentler than most of the other books on Ramsey theory". Throughout the book, Robertson discusses several theorems including Ramsey's Theorem, Van der Waerden's Theorem, Rado's Theorem, and Hales–Jewett Theorem.
