= Robert D. Hough =

American mathematician

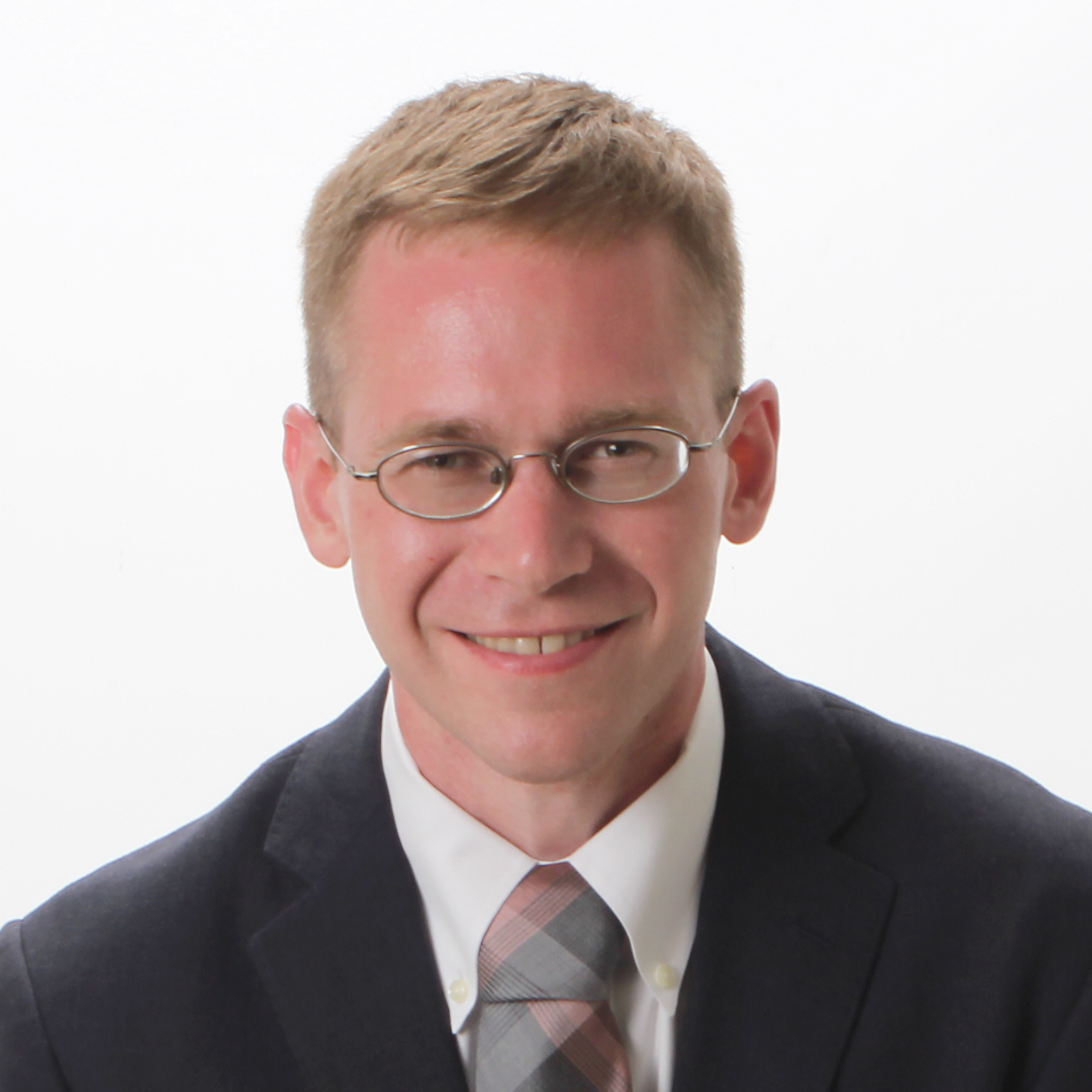
- Education: Stanford University
- Known for: Probability Theory, Number Theory
- Awards: David P. Robbins Prize (2017); Sloan Research Fellowship (2020); Stony Brook Trustees Faculty Award (2020)
- Scientific career
- Fields: Mathematics
- Workplaces: Stony Brook University
- Thesis: Distribution problems in number theory (2012)
- Doctoral advisor: Kannan Soundararajan
- Website: math.stonybrook.edu/~rdhough/

Robert D. Hough is an American born mathematician specializing in number theory, probability, and discrete mathematics. He is currently an associate professor of mathematics at Stony Brook University.

== Early life and education ==
Hough holds BS in Math, MS in CS, and PhD in Math degrees from Stanford University. He completed his PhD under Kannan Soundararajan in 2012. Hough was a post-doctoral researcher at Cambridge University and Oxford University in the United Kingdom working with Ben Green from 2013 to 2015, and was a post-doctoral member of the Institute for Advanced Study, Princeton, New Jersey from 2015 to 2016.

== Career ==
Hough joined Stony Brook University as an assistant professor in 2016 and has been an associate professor of mathematics since 2022.

== Achievements ==
Hough won the Mathematical Association of America's David P. Robbins Prize at the Joint Math Meetings in 2017. The prize was given for finding the solution of a problem imposed by Paul Erdős.

In February 2020, Hough won the Sloan Research Fellowship. He also won a Trustees Faculty Award from Stony Brook University.
