= Unit square =

Square with side length one

The unit square in the real plane

In mathematics, a unit square is a square whose sides have length 1. Often, the unit square refers specifically to the square in the Cartesian plane with corners at the four points (0, 0), (1, 0), (0, 1), and (1, 1).

== Cartesian coordinates ==
In a Cartesian coordinate system with coordinates (x, y), a unit square is defined as a square consisting of the points where both x and y lie in a closed unit interval from 0 to 1.

That is, a unit square is the Cartesian product I × I, where I denotes the closed unit interval.

== Complex coordinates ==
The unit square can also be thought of as a subset of the complex plane, the topological space formed by the complex numbers. In this view, the four corners of the unit square are at the four complex numbers 0, 1, i, and 1 + i.

== Rational distance problem ==
Unsolved problem in mathematics
Is there a point in the plane at a rational distance from all four corners of a unit square?
More unsolved problems in mathematics

It is not known whether any point in the plane is a rational distance from all four vertices of the unit square.

== See also ==
- Unit circle
- Unit cube
- Unit sphere
