= Self-cleaning floor =

Surface that stays hygienic without external action

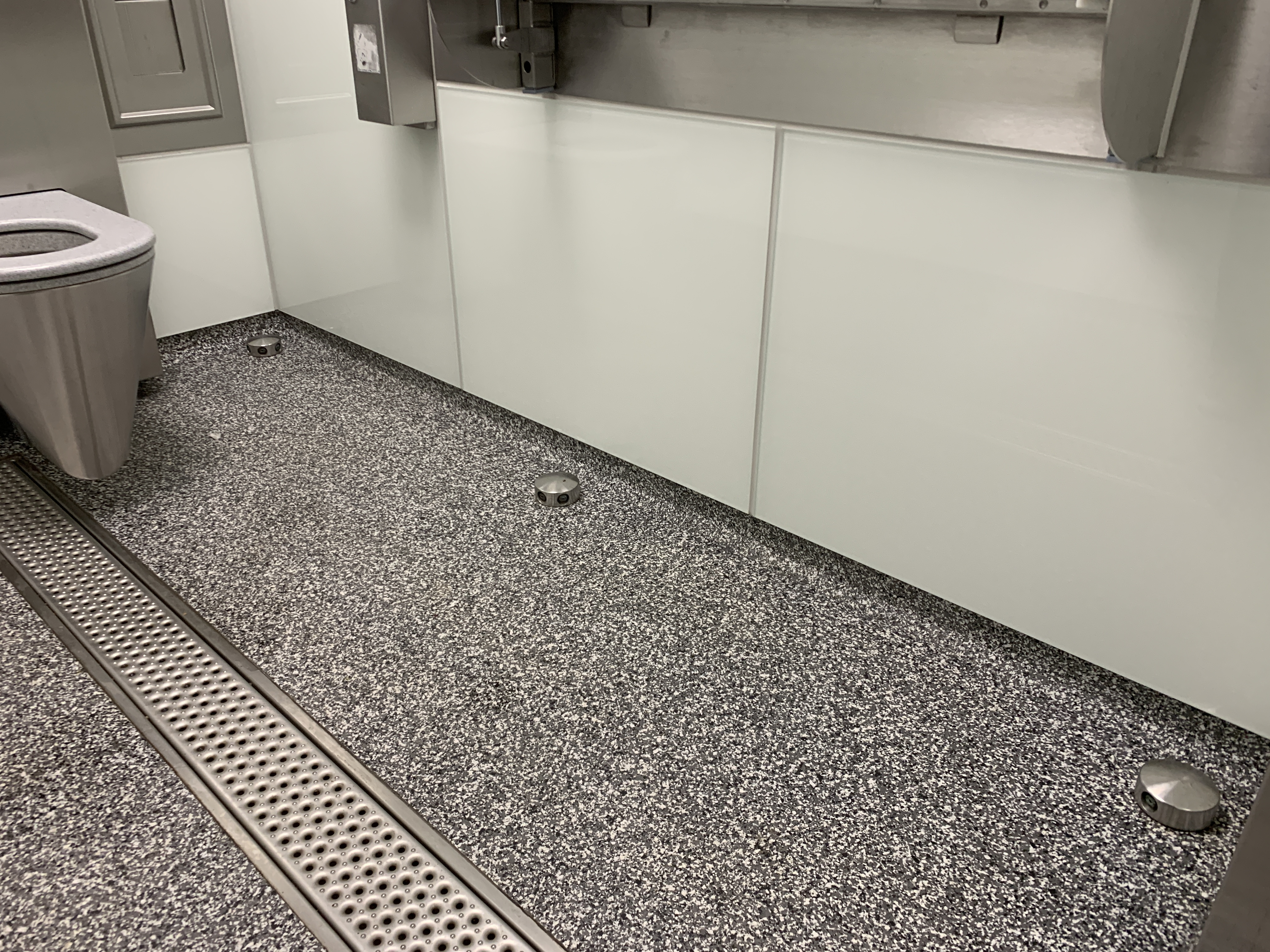
Floor of a public toilet in Germany, designed to be cleaned automatically

A self-cleaning floor is a surface that has the ability to clean itself without external action. This is usually accomplished through automated pods set to dispense water regularly, but can also be accomplished through the use of materials that naturally reduce pathogens. Such floors are designed to stay hygienic with little maintenance, and are most often installed in places that require constant maintenance and cleaning, such as hospitals and washrooms. In Europe and a few African countries, many ceramic tiles and sanitary ware manufacturers have products on the market with self-cleaning features.

== Industrial applications ==
=== Hospitals ===
The Grabo Silver Knight resilient floor covering is the first photocatalytic self-disinfecting surface. Its self-disinfecting property is accomplished through the use of nano-silver and nano-titanium dioxide particles. This product is targeted towards the health sector, aiding in preventing the spread of infection in hospitals.

=== Dairy ===
The Cozy Floor is a self-supported, self-cleaning hot water heated floor system, designed to eliminate the use of bedding under calves.

=== Food processing facilities ===
The SunWash self-cleaning floor coatings provide a washable finish and are developed to withstand high traffic and humid conditions in food processing facilities.

=== Food service ===
Mechline Developments’ Sani-Floor consists of a suction pump and automatic waste lifting. The system is intended for use in any food production area to take care of spills hygienically and safely.

=== Public restrooms ===
Many public toilets, such as the Sanisette, have utilized self-cleaning floor mechanisms.

== Conceptual designs ==
The Smart-Floor is a concept designed by Svetozar Belogrozdev of Swansea Metropolitan University. It is a self-cleaning floor design that is intended to prevent dust and dirt from settling. Regulated vacuums cycle through the floor constantly while intelligent pressure sensors detect if there is anything in the room and automatically regulate the vacuum going through the tiles. The Smart-Floor is one of the six UK designs that won the top 100 designs in Electrolux Design Lab 2013.

Another approach to self-cleaning floors involves the use of central vacuum systems beneath micro-perforated raised floor tiles. These systems create a small negative pressure to automatically collect all dust and dirt.

== See also ==
- Self-cleaning glass
- Self-cleaning oven
- Robotic vacuum cleaner
- Central vacuum cleaner
