= David P. Robbins Prize =

Mathematical award

The David P. Robbins Prize for papers reporting novel research in algebra, combinatorics, or discrete mathematics is awarded both by the American Mathematical Society (AMS) and by the Mathematical Association of America (MAA). The AMS award recognizes papers with a significant experimental component on a topic which is broadly accessible which provide a simple statement of the problem and clear exposition of the work. Papers eligible for the MAA award are judged on quality of research, clarity of exposition, and accessibility to undergraduates. Both awards consist of $5000 and are awarded once every three years. They are named in the honor of David P. Robbins and were established in 2005 by the members of his family.

== Winners (AMS Robbins Prize) ==
- 2025 : Sophie Morier-Genoud and Valentin Ovsienko for their paper "q-deformed rationals and q-continued fractions," Forum of Mathematics, Sigma, 8 (2020), Paper No. e13, 55 pp.
- 2022 : Alin Bostan, Irina Kurkova, and Kilian Raschel for their paper "A human proof of Gessel's lattice path conjecture," Transactions of the American Mathematical Society, 369 (2017), 1365-1393.
- 2019 : Roger Behrend, Ilse Fischer and Matjaž Konvalinka for their paper "Diagonally and antidiagonally symmetric alternating sign matrices of odd order", Advances in Mathematics 315:324–365, 2017.
- 2016 : Manuel Kauers, Christoph Koutschan and Doron Zeilberger for their paper "Proof of George Andrews's and David Robbins's q-TSPP conjecture", Proceedings of the National Academy of Sciences (PNAS) 108(6) pp. 2196–2199.
- 2013 : Alexander Razborov for his paper "On the minimal density of triangles in graphs", Combinatorics, Probability and Computing 17(4):603–618, 2008.
- 2010 : Ileana Streinu for her paper "Pseudo-triangulations, rigidity and motion planning", Discrete & Computational Geometry 34(4):587–635, 2005.
- 2007 : Samuel P. Ferguson and Thomas C. Hales for their paper "A proof of the Kepler conjecture," Annals of Mathematics, 162:1065–1185, 2005.

== Winners (MAA Robbins Prize) ==
- 2023 : Samantha Dahlberg, Angele Foley, Stephanie van Willigenburg for their paper "Resolving Stanley's e-positivity of claw-contractible-free graphs", J. Eur. Math. Soc. (JEMS) 22:2673–2696, 2020.
- 2020 : Aubrey de Grey for his paper "The chromatic number of the plane is at least 5", Geombinatorics, 28:18-31, 2018.
- 2017 : Robert Hough for his paper "Solution of the minimum modulus problem for covering systems", Annals of Mathematics, 181:361–382, 2015.
- 2014 : Frederick V. Henle and James M. Henle for their paper "Squaring the plane", The American Mathematical Monthly, 115:3–12, 2008.
- 2011 : Mike Paterson, Yuval Peres, Mikkel Thorup, Peter Winkler, and Uri Zwick for their papers "Overhang", The American Mathematical Monthly, 116:19–44, 2009, and "Maximum Overhang", The American Mathematical Monthly, 116:763–787 2009.
- 2008 : Neil Sloane for "The on-line encyclopedia of integer sequences", Notices of the American Mathematical Society, 50:912–915, 2003.

== See also ==
- List of mathematics awards
