= Alternating sign matrix =

Mathematical model

$$\begin{matrix}
\begin{bmatrix}
1 & 0 & 0\\
0 & 1 & 0\\
0 & 0 & 1
\end{bmatrix}
\qquad
\begin{bmatrix}
1 & 0 & 0\\
0 & 0 & 1\\
0 & 1 & 0
\end{bmatrix}
\\
\begin{bmatrix}
0 & 1 & 0\\
1 & 0 & 0\\
0 & 0 & 1
\end{bmatrix}
\qquad
\begin{bmatrix}
0 &  1 & 0\\
1 & -1 & 1\\
0 &  1 & 0
\end{bmatrix}
\qquad
\begin{bmatrix}
0 & 1 & 0\\
0 & 0 & 1\\
1 & 0 & 0
\end{bmatrix}
\\
\begin{bmatrix}
0 & 0 & 1\\
1 & 0 & 0\\
0 & 1 & 0
\end{bmatrix}
\qquad
\begin{bmatrix}
0 & 0 & 1\\
0 & 1 & 0\\
1 & 0 & 0
\end{bmatrix}
\end{matrix}$$
The seven alternating sign matrices of size 3

In mathematics, an alternating sign matrix is a square matrix of 0s, 1s, and −1s such that the sum of each row and column is 1 and the nonzero entries in each row and column alternate in sign. These matrices generalize permutation matrices and arise naturally when using Dodgson condensation to compute a determinant. They are also closely related to the six-vertex model with domain wall boundary conditions from statistical mechanics. They were first defined by William Mills, David Robbins, and Howard Rumsey in the former context.

== Examples ==
The permutation matrices are precisely the alternating sign matrices that don't contain −1.

An example of an alternating sign matrix that is not a permutation matrix is

Puzzle picture corresponding to the 4x4 alternating sign matrix shown to the left. Green pieces represent zeros, vertical yellow pieces are 1 and horizontal yellow pieces are -1.

$$\begin{bmatrix}
0&0&1&0\\
1&0&0&0\\
0&1&-1&1\\
0&0&1&0
\end{bmatrix}.$$

== Alternating sign matrix theorem ==
The alternating sign matrix theorem states that the number of $n\times n$ alternating sign matrices is

$$\prod_{k=0}^{n-1}\frac{(3k+1)!}{(n+k)!} = \frac{1!\, 4! \,7! \cdots (3n-2)!}{n!\, (n+1)! \cdots (2n-1)!}.$$

The first few terms in this sequence for n = 0, 1, 2, 3, … are

1, 1, 2, 7, 42, 429, 7436, 218348, … (sequence A005130 in the OEIS).

This theorem was first proved by Doron Zeilberger in 1992. In 1995, Greg Kuperberg gave a short proof based on the Yang–Baxter equation for the six-vertex model with domain-wall boundary conditions, that uses a determinant calculation due to Anatoli Izergin. In 2005, a third proof was given by Ilse Fischer using what is called the operator method.

== Razumov–Stroganov problem ==
In 2001, A. Razumov and Y. Stroganov conjectured a connection between O(1) loop model, fully packed loop model and alternating sign matrices. This conjecture was proved in 2010 by Cantini and Sportiello.
