= Doron Zeilberger =

Israeli mathematician

- דורון ציילברגר
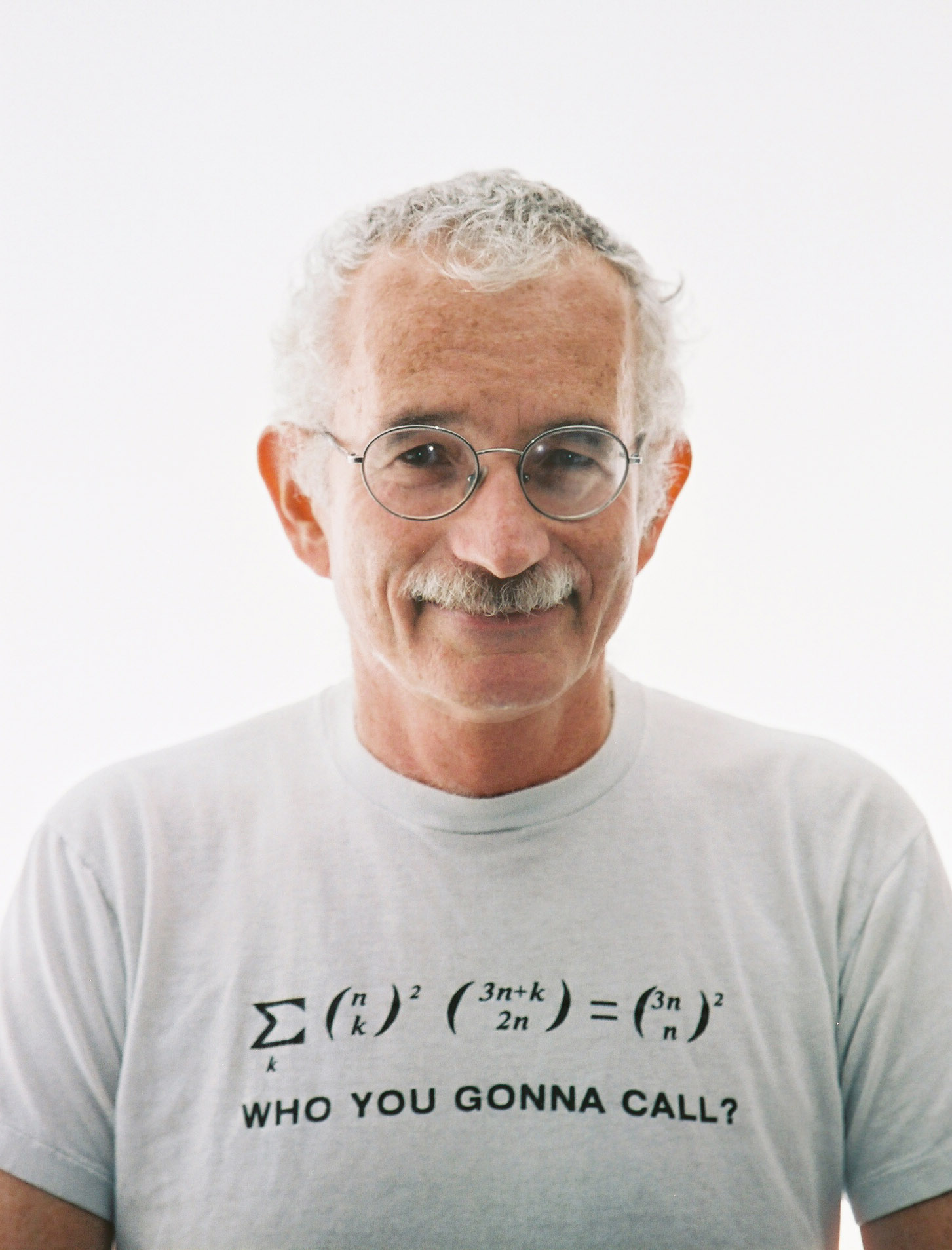
- Zeilberger circa 2005, displaying a hypergeometric identity on his T-shirt
- Born: 2 July 1950 (age 75); Haifa, Israel
- Education: Weizmann Institute of Science
- Known for: Alternating sign matrix conjecture Zeilberger–Bressoud theorem Wilf–Zeilberger pair
- Awards: Lester R. Ford Award (1990); Leroy P. Steele Prize (1998); Euler Medal (2004); David P. Robbins Prize (2016)
- Scientific career
- Fields: Mathematics, Computer Science
- Institutions: Rutgers University
- Doctoral advisor: Harry Dym
- Doctoral students: Aaron Robertson
- Website: sites.math.rutgers.edu/~zeilberg/

Doron Zeilberger (Hebrew: דורון ציילברגר; born 2 July 1950) is an Israeli-American mathematician. He is known for his work in combinatorics and writings on ultrafinitism.

== Education and career ==
He received his doctorate from the Weizmann Institute of Science in 1976, under the direction of Harry Dym, with the thesis "New Approaches and Results in the Theory of Discrete Analytic Functions." He is a Board of Governors Professor of Mathematics at Rutgers University.

== Mathematical work ==
Zeilberger has made contributions to combinatorics, hypergeometric identities, and q-series. He gave the first proof of the alternating sign matrix conjecture, noteworthy not only for its mathematical content, but also for the fact that Zeilberger recruited nearly a hundred volunteer checkers to "pre-referee" the paper. In 2011, together with Manuel Kauers and Christoph Koutschan, Zeilberger proved the q-TSPP conjecture, which was independently stated in 1983 by George Andrews and David P. Robbins.

Zeilberger is an ultrafinitist. He is also known for crediting his computer "Shalosh B. Ekhad" as a co-author ("Shalosh" and "Ekhad" mean "Three" and "One" in Hebrew respectively, referring to his first computer, an AT&T 3B1), and for his provocative opinions published on his "Dr. Z's Opinions" page.

== Awards and honors ==
Zeilberger received a Lester R. Ford Award in 1990. Together with Herbert Wilf, Zeilberger was awarded the American Mathematical Society's Leroy P. Steele Prize for Seminal Contributions to Research in 1998 for their development of WZ theory, which has revolutionized the field of hypergeometric summation. In 2004, Zeilberger was awarded the Euler Medal; the citation refers to him as "a champion of using computers and algorithms to do mathematics quickly and efficiently". In 2016 he received, together with Manuel Kauers and Christoph Koutschan, the David P. Robbins Prize of the American Mathematical Society.

Zeilberger was a member of the inaugural 2013 class of fellows of the American Mathematical Society.

== See also ==
- MacMahon Master theorem
- Wilf–Zeilberger pair
