= Unit cube =

Cube with edge length one

Unit cube

A unit cube, more formally a cube of side 1, is a cube whose sides are 1 unit long. The volume of a 3-dimensional unit cube is 1 cubic unit, and its total surface area is 6 square units.

== Unit hypercube ==
The term unit cube or unit hypercube is also used for hypercubes, or "cubes" in n-dimensional spaces, for values of n other than 3 and edge length 1.

Sometimes the term "unit cube" refers in specific to the set [0, 1]^{n} of all n-tuples of numbers in the interval [0, 1].

The length of the longest diagonal of a unit hypercube of n dimensions is $\sqrt n$, the square root of n and the (Euclidean) length of the vector (1,1,1,....1,1) in n-dimensional space.

== See also ==
- Doubling the cube
- k-cell
- Robbins constant, the average distance between two random points in a unit cube
- Tychonoff cube, an infinite-dimensional analogue of the unit cube
- Unit square
- Unit sphere
