= Peter Paule =

Austrian mathematician

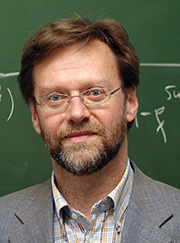
Peter Paule, 2010

Peter Paule is an Austrian mathematician who works in symbolic computation and its connections to combinatorics, number theory, and special functions. Since 1990 he has held a faculty position at the Research Institute for Symbolic Computation of the Johannes Kepler University of Linz, and since 2009 he has directed the Institute.

Paule earned his doctorate from the University of Vienna in 1982 under the supervision of Johann Cigler, and earned a habilitation from Johannes Kepler University in 1996. He is a member of the Academia Europaea, and in 2013 he was elected as a fellow of the American Mathematical Society.
