= David P. Robbins =

American mathematician

David Peter Robbins (12 August 1942 in Brooklyn – 4 September 2003 in Princeton) was an American mathematician. He is most famous for introducing alternating sign matrices. He is also known for his work on generalizations of Heron's formula on the area of polygons, due to which Robbins pentagons (cyclic pentagons with integer side lengths and areas) were named after him.

Robbins grew up in Manhattan, where he attended the Fieldston School. He studied at Harvard, where his undergraduate advisor was Andrew Gleason. He went to MIT to do his graduate work and, after a hiatus during which he taught at Fieldston, finished his Ph.D. in 1970. He then taught at MIT, Phillips Exeter Academy, Hamilton College and Washington and Lee University. In 1980 he moved to Princeton, New Jersey and worked at the Institute for Defense Analyses Center for Communications Research there until his death from pancreatic cancer.

A symposium was held in Robbins' honor in June 2003, the papers from which were published as a special issue of the journal Advances in Applied Mathematics. The Mathematical Association of America established a prize named in his honor in 2005, given every three years to one or more researchers in algebra, combinatorics, or discrete mathematics. The first winner of the prize, in 2008, was Neil Sloane for the On-Line Encyclopedia of Integer Sequences.

The American Mathematical Society has another prize, the David P. Robbins Prize (AMS) with the same name the first winners of which were Samuel P. Ferguson and Thomas C. Hales for their work on the Kepler conjecture.

== See also ==
- Robbins constant, the average distance between two random points in a unit cube
