= Constant-recursive sequence =

Infinite sequence of numbers satisfying a linear equation

The Fibonacci sequence is constant-recursive: each element of the sequence is the sum of the previous two.

Hasse diagram of some subclasses of constant-recursive sequences, ordered by inclusion

In mathematics, an infinite sequence of numbers $s_0, s_1, s_2, s_3, \ldots$ is called constant-recursive if it satisfies an equation of the form

$$s_n = c_1 s_{n-1} + c_2 s_{n-2} + \dots + c_d s_{n-d},$$

for all $n \ge d$, where $c_i$ are constants. The equation is called a linear recurrence relation. The concept is also known as a linear recurrence sequence, linear-recursive sequence, linear-recurrent sequence, or a C-finite sequence.

For example, the Fibonacci sequence

$$0, 1, 1, 2, 3, 5, 8, 13, \ldots$$,

is constant-recursive because it satisfies the linear recurrence $F_n = F_{n-1} + F_{n-2}$: each number in the sequence is the sum of the previous two. Other examples include the power of two sequence $1, 2, 4, 8, 16, \ldots$, where each number is the sum of twice the previous number, and the square number sequence $0, 1, 4, 9, 16, 25, \ldots$. All arithmetic progressions, all geometric progressions, and all polynomials are constant-recursive. However, not all sequences are constant-recursive; for example, the factorial sequence $1, 1, 2, 6, 24, 120, \ldots$ is not constant-recursive.

Constant-recursive sequences are studied in combinatorics and the theory of finite differences. They also arise in algebraic number theory, due to the relation of the sequence to polynomial roots; in the analysis of algorithms, as the running time of simple recursive functions; and in the theory of formal languages, where they count strings up to a given length in a regular language. Constant-recursive sequences are closed under important mathematical operations such as term-wise addition, term-wise multiplication, and Cauchy product.

The Skolem–Mahler–Lech theorem states that the zeros of a constant-recursive sequence have a regularly repeating (eventually periodic) form. The Skolem problem, which asks for an algorithm to determine whether a linear recurrence has at least one zero, is an unsolved problem in mathematics.

== Definition ==
A constant-recursive sequence is any sequence of integers, rational numbers, algebraic numbers, real numbers, or complex numbers $s_0, s_1, s_2, s_3, \ldots$ (written as $(s_n)_{n=0}^\infty$ as a shorthand) satisfying a formula of the form

$$s_n = c_1 s_{n-1} + c_2 s_{n-2} + \dots + c_d s_{n-d} = \sum_{k=1}^d c_k s_{n-k},$$

for all $n \ge d,$ for some fixed coefficients $c_1, c_2, \dots, c_d$ ranging over the same domain as the sequence (integers, rational numbers, algebraic numbers, real numbers, or complex numbers). The equation is called a linear recurrence with constant coefficients of order d. The order of the sequence is the smallest positive integer $d$ such that the sequence satisfies a recurrence of order d, or $d = 0$ for the everywhere-zero sequence.

The definition above allows eventually-periodic sequences such as $1, 0, 0, 0, \ldots$ and $0, 1, 0, 0, \ldots$. Some authors require that $c_d \ne 0$, which excludes such sequences.

== Examples ==
Selected examples of integer constant-recursive sequences
| Name | Order ($d$) | First few values | Recurrence (for $n \ge d$) | Generating function | OEIS |
|---|---|---|---|---|---|
| Zero sequence | 0 | 0, 0, 0, 0, 0, 0, ... | $s_n = 0$ | $\frac{0}{1}$ | A000004 |
| One sequence | 1 | 1, 1, 1, 1, 1, 1, ... | $s_n = s_{n-1}$ | $\frac{1}{1-x}$ | A000012 |
| Characteristic function of $\{0\}$ | 1 | 1, 0, 0, 0, 0, 0, ... | $s_n = 0$ | $\frac{1}{1}$ | A000007 |
| Powers of two | 1 | 1, 2, 4, 8, 16, 32, ... | $s_n = 2 s_{n-1}$ | $\frac{1}{1-2x}$ | A000079 |
| Powers of −1 | 1 | 1, −1, 1, −1, 1, −1, ... | $s_n = -s_{n-1}$ | $\frac{1}{1+x}$ | A033999 |
| Characteristic function of $\{1\}$ | 2 | 0, 1, 0, 0, 0, 0, ... | $s_n = 0$ | $\frac{x}{1}$ | A063524 |
| Decimal expansion of 1/6 | 2 | 1, 6, 6, 6, 6, 6, ... | $s_n = s_{n-1}$ | $\frac{1 + 5x}{1 - x}$ | A020793 |
| Decimal expansion of 1/11 | 2 | 0, 9, 0, 9, 0, 9, ... | $s_n = s_{n-2}$ | $\frac{9x}{1-x^2}$ | A010680 |
| Nonnegative integers | 2 | 0, 1, 2, 3, 4, 5, ... | $s_n = 2s_{n-1} - s_{n-2}$ | $\frac{x}{(1-x)^2}$ | A001477 |
| Odd positive integers | 2 | 1, 3, 5, 7, 9, 11, ... | $s_n = 2s_{n-1} - s_{n-2}$ | $\frac{1+x}{(1-x)^2}$ | A005408 |
| Fibonacci numbers | 2 | 0, 1, 1, 2, 3, 5, 8, 13, ... | $s_n = s_{n-1} + s_{n-2}$ | $\frac{x}{1-x-x^2}$ | A000045 |
| Lucas numbers | 2 | 2, 1, 3, 4, 7, 11, 18, 29, ... | $s_n = s_{n-1} + s_{n-2}$ | $\frac{2-x}{1-x-x^2}$ | A000032 |
| Pell numbers | 2 | 0, 1, 2, 5, 12, 29, 70, ... | $s_n = 2s_{n-1} + s_{n-2}$ | $\frac{x}{1-2x-x^2}$ | A000129 |
| Powers of two interleaved with 0s | 2 | 1, 0, 2, 0, 4, 0, 8, 0, ... | $s_n = 2 s_{n-2}$ | $\frac{1}{1-2x^2}$ | A077957 |
| Reciprocal of 6th cyclotomic polynomial | 2 | 1, 1, 0, −1, −1, 0, 1, 1, ... | $s_n = s_{n-1} - s_{n-2}$ | $\frac{1}{1-x+x^2}$ | A010892 |
| Triangular numbers | 3 | 0, 1, 3, 6, 10, 15, 21, ... | $s_n = 3s_{n-1} - 3s_{n-2} + s_{n-3}$ | $\frac{x}{(1-x)^3}$ | A000217 |

=== Fibonacci and Lucas sequences ===
The sequence 0, 1, 1, 2, 3, 5, 8, 13, ... of Fibonacci numbers is constant-recursive of order 2 because it satisfies the recurrence $F_n = F_{n-1} + F_{n-2}$ with $F_0 = 0, F_1 = 1$. For example, $F_2 = F_1 + F_0 = 1 + 0 = 1$ and $F_6 = F_5 + F_4 = 5 + 3 = 8$. The sequence 2, 1, 3, 4, 7, 11, ... of Lucas numbers satisfies the same recurrence as the Fibonacci sequence but with initial conditions $L_0 = 2$ and $L_1 = 1$. More generally, every Lucas sequence is constant-recursive of order 2.

=== Arithmetic progressions ===
For any $a$ and any $r \ne 0$, the arithmetic progression $a, a+r, a+2r, \ldots$ is constant-recursive of order 2, because it satisfies $s_n = 2s_{n-1} - s_{n-2}$. Generalizing this, see polynomial sequences below.

=== Geometric progressions ===
For any $a \ne 0$ and $r$, the geometric progression $a, a r, a r^2, \ldots$ is constant-recursive of order 1, because it satisfies $s_n = r s_{n-1}$. This includes, for example, the sequence 1, 2, 4, 8, 16, ... as well as the rational number sequence $1, \frac12, \frac14, \frac18, \frac{1}{16}, ...$.

=== Eventually periodic sequences ===
A sequence that is eventually periodic with period length $\ell$ is constant-recursive, since it satisfies $s_n = s_{n-\ell}$ for all $n \geq d$, where the order $d$ is the length of the initial segment including the first repeating block. Examples of such sequences are 1, 0, 0, 0, ... (order 1) and 1, 6, 6, 6, ... (order 2).

=== Polynomial sequences ===
A sequence defined by a polynomial $s_n = a_0 + a_1 n + a_2 n^2 + \cdots + a_d n^d$ is constant-recursive. The sequence satisfies a recurrence of order $d + 1$ (where $d$ is the degree of the polynomial), with coefficients given by the corresponding element of the binomial transform. The first few such equations are

$s_n = 1 \cdot s_{n-1}$ for a degree 0 (that is, constant) polynomial,
$s_n = 2\cdot s_{n-1} - 1\cdot s_{n-2}$ for a degree 1 or less polynomial,
$s_n = 3\cdot s_{n-1} - 3\cdot s_{n-2} + 1\cdot s_{n-3}$ for a degree 2 or less polynomial, and
$s_n = 4\cdot s_{n-1} - 6\cdot s_{n-2} + 4\cdot s_{n-3} - 1\cdot s_{n-4}$ for a degree 3 or less polynomial.

A sequence obeying the order-d equation also obeys all higher order equations. These identities may be proved in a number of ways, including via the theory of finite differences. Any sequence of $d + 1$ integer, real, or complex values can be used as initial conditions for a constant-recursive sequence of order $d + 1$. If the initial conditions lie on a polynomial of degree $d - 1$ or less, then the constant-recursive sequence also obeys a lower order equation.

=== Enumeration of words in a regular language ===
Let $L$ be a regular language, and let $s_n$ be the number of words of length $n$ in $L$. Then $(s_n)_{n=0}^\infty$ is constant-recursive. For example, $s_n = 2^n$ for the language of all binary strings, $s_n = 1$ for the language of all unary strings, and $s_n = F_{n+2}$ for the language of all binary strings that do not have two consecutive ones. More generally, any function accepted by a weighted automaton over the unary alphabet $\Sigma = \{a\}$ over the semiring $(\mathbb{R}, +, \times)$ (which is in fact a ring, and even a field) is constant-recursive.

=== Other examples ===
The sequences of Jacobsthal numbers, Padovan numbers, Pell numbers, and Perrin numbers are constant-recursive.

=== Non-examples ===
The factorial sequence $1, 1, 2, 6, 24, 120, 720, \ldots$ is not constant-recursive. More generally, every constant-recursive function is asymptotically bounded by an exponential function (see #Closed-form characterization) and the factorial sequence grows faster than this.

The Catalan sequence $1, 1, 2, 5, 14, 42, 132, \ldots$ is not constant-recursive. This is because the generating function of the Catalan numbers is not a rational function (see #Equivalent definitions).

== Equivalent definitions ==
=== In terms of matrices ===
$$F_n = \begin{bmatrix}0 & 1\end{bmatrix}
\begin{bmatrix}1 & 1 \\ 1 & 0\end{bmatrix}^n
\begin{bmatrix}1 \\ 0\end{bmatrix}.$$

Definition of the Fibonacci sequence using matrices.

A sequence $(s_n)_{n=0}^\infty$ is constant-recursive of order less than or equal to $d$ if and only if it can be written as

$$s_n = u A^n v$$

where $u$ is a $1 \times d$ vector, $A$ is a $d \times d$ matrix, and $v$ is a $d \times 1$ vector, where the elements come from the same domain (integers, rational numbers, algebraic numbers, real numbers, or complex numbers) as the original sequence. Specifically, $v$ can be taken to be the first $d$ values of the sequence, $A$ the linear transformation that computes $s_{n+1}, s_{n+2}, \ldots, s_{n+d}$ from $s_n, s_{n+1}, \ldots, s_{n+d-1}$, and $u$ the vector $[0, 0, \ldots, 0, 1]$.

=== In terms of non-homogeneous linear recurrences ===
| Non-homogeneous | Homogeneous |
|---|---|
| $s_n = 1 + s_{n-1}$ | $s_n = 2s_{n-1} - s_{n-2}$ |
| $s_0 = 0$ | $s_0 = 0; s_1 = 1$ |

Definition of the sequence of natural numbers $s_n = n$, using a non-homogeneous recurrence and the equivalent homogeneous version.

A non-homogeneous linear recurrence is an equation of the form

$$s_n = c_1 s_{n-1} + c_2 s_{n-2} + \dots + c_d s_{n-d} + c$$

where $c$ is an additional constant. Any sequence satisfying a non-homogeneous linear recurrence is constant-recursive. This is because subtracting the equation for $s_{n-1}$ from the equation for $s_n$ yields a homogeneous recurrence for $s_n - s_{n-1}$, from which we can solve for $s_n$ to obtain

$$\begin{align}s_n = &(c_1 + 1) s_{n-1} \\ &+ (c_2 - c_1) s_{n-2} + \dots + (c_d  - c_{d-1}) s_{n-d} \\&- c_d s_{n-d-1}.\end{align}$$

=== In terms of generating functions ===
$\sum_{n = 0}^\infty F_n x^n = \frac{x}{1-x-x^2}.$

Definition of the Fibonacci sequence using a generating function.

A sequence is constant-recursive precisely when its generating function

$$\sum_{n = 0}^\infty s_n x^n = s_0 + s_1 x^1 + s_2 x^2 + s_3 x^3 + \cdots$$

is a rational function $p(x) \,/\, q(x)$, where $p$ and $q$ are polynomials and $q(0) = 1$. Moreover, the order of the sequence is the minimum $d$ such that it has such a form with $\text{deg } q(x) \le d$ and $\text{deg } p(x) < d$.

The denominator is the polynomial obtained from the auxiliary polynomial by reversing the order of the coefficients, and the numerator is determined by the initial values of the sequence:

$$\sum_{n = 0}^\infty s_n x^n = \frac{b_0 + b_1 x^1 + b_2 x^2 + \dots + b_{d-1} x^{d-1}}{1 - c_1 x^1 - c_2 x^2 - \dots - c_d x^d},$$

where

$b_n = s_n - c_1 s_{n-1} - c_2 s_{n-2} - \dots - c_d s_{n-d}.$

It follows from the above that the denominator $q(x)$ must be a polynomial not divisible by $x$ (and in particular nonzero).

=== In terms of sequence spaces ===
$\{(a n + b)_{n=0}^\infty : a, b \in \mathbb{R}\}$

2-dimensional vector space of sequences generated by the sequence $s_n = n$.

A sequence $(s_n)_{n=0}^\infty$ is constant-recursive if and only if the set of sequences

$$\left\{(s_{n+r})_{n=0}^\infty : r \geq 0\right\}$$

is contained in a sequence space (vector space of sequences) whose dimension is finite. That is, $(s_n)_{n=0}^\infty$ is contained in a finite-dimensional subspace of $\mathbb{C}^\mathbb{N}$ closed under the left-shift operator.

This characterization is because the order-$d$ linear recurrence relation can be understood as a proof of linear dependence between the sequences $(s_{n+r})_{n=0}^\infty$ for $r=0, \ldots, d$. An extension of this argument shows that the order of the sequence is equal to the dimension of the sequence space generated by $(s_{n+r})_{n=0}^\infty$ for all $r$.

== Closed-form characterization ==
$F_n = \frac{1}{\sqrt{5}}(1.618\ldots)^n - \frac{1}{\sqrt{5}}(-0.618\ldots)^n$

Closed-form characterization of the Fibonacci sequence (Binet's formula)

Constant-recursive sequences admit the following unique closed form characterization using exponential polynomials: every constant-recursive sequence can be written in the form

$$s_n = z_n + k_1(n) r_1^n + k_2(n) r_2^n + \cdots + k_e(n) r_e^n,$$

for all $n \ge 0$, where

- The term $z_n$ is a sequence which is zero for all $n \ge d$ (where $d$ is the order of the sequence);
- The terms $k_1(n), k_2(n), \ldots, k_e(n)$ are complex polynomials; and
- The terms $r_1, r_2, \ldots, r_k$ are distinct complex constants.

This characterization is exact: every sequence of complex numbers that can be written in the above form is constant-recursive.

For example, the Fibonacci number $F_n$ is written in this form using Binet's formula:

$$F_n = \frac{1}{\sqrt{5}}\varphi^n - \frac{1}{\sqrt{5}}\psi^n,$$

where $\varphi = (1 + \sqrt{5}) \,/\, 2 \approx 1.61803\ldots$ is the golden ratio and $\psi = -1 \,/\, \varphi$. These are the roots of the equation $x^2 - x - 1 = 0$. In this case, $e=2$, $z_n = 0$ for all $n$, $k_1(n) = k_2(n) = 1 \,/\, \sqrt{5}$ are both constant polynomials, $r_1 = \varphi$, and $r_2 = \psi$.

The term $z_n$ is only needed when $c_d\ne 0$; if $c_d = 0$ then it corrects for the fact that some initial values may be exceptions to the general recurrence. In particular, $z_n = 0$ for all $n \ge d$.

The complex numbers $r_1, \ldots, r_n$ are the roots of the characteristic polynomial of the recurrence:

$$x^d - c_1 x^{d-1} - \dots - c_{d-1} x - c_d$$

whose coefficients are the same as those of the recurrence. We call $r_1, \ldots , r_n$ the characteristic roots of the recurrence. If the sequence consists of integers or rational numbers, the roots will be algebraic numbers. If the $d$ roots $r_1, r_2, \dots, r_d$ are all distinct, then the polynomials $k_i(n)$ are all constants, which can be determined from the initial values of the sequence. If the roots of the characteristic polynomial are not distinct, and $r_i$ is a root of multiplicity $m$, then $k_i(n)$ in the formula has degree $m - 1$. For instance, if the characteristic polynomial factors as $(x-r)^3$, with the same root r occurring three times, then the $n$th term is of the form $s_n = (a + b n + c n^2) r^n.$

== Closure properties ==
=== Examples ===
The sum of two constant-recursive sequences is also constant-recursive. For example, the sum of $s_n = 2^n$ and $t_n = n$ is $u_n = 2^n + n$ ($1, 3, 6, 11, 20, \ldots$), which satisfies the recurrence $u_n = 4u_{n-1} - 5u_{n-2} + 2u_{n-3}$. The new recurrence can be found by adding the generating functions for each sequence.

Similarly, the product of two constant-recursive sequences is constant-recursive. For example, the product of $s_n = 2^n$ and $t_n = n$ is $u_n = n \cdot 2^n$ ($0, 2, 8, 24, 64, \ldots$), which satisfies the recurrence $u_n = 4 u_{n-1} - 4 u_{n-2}$.

The left-shift sequence $u_n = s_{n + 1}$ and the right-shift sequence $u_n = s_{n - 1}$ (with $u_0 = 0$) are constant-recursive because they satisfy the same recurrence relation. For example, because $s_n = 2^n$ is constant-recursive, so is $u_n = 2^{n + 1}$.

=== List of operations ===
In general, constant-recursive sequences are closed under the following operations, where $s = (s_n)_{n \in \mathbb{N}}, t = (t_n)_{n \in \mathbb{N}}$ denote constant-recursive sequences, $f(x), g(x)$ are their generating functions, and $d, e$ are their orders, respectively.

Operations on constant-recursive sequences
| Operation | Definition | Requirement | Generating function equivalent | Order |
|---|---|---|---|---|
| Term-wise sum $s + t$ | $(s + t)_n = s_n + t_n$ | — | $f(x) + g(x)$ | $\le d + e$ |
| Term-wise product $s \cdot t$ | $(s \cdot t)_n = s_n \cdot t_n$ | — | $\frac{1}{2 \pi i} \int_\gamma \frac{f(\zeta)}{\zeta} g\left(\frac{x}{\zeta}\right) \; \mathrm{d}\zeta$ | $\le d \cdot e$ |
| Cauchy product $s * t$ | $(s * t)_n = \sum_{i=0}^n s_i t_{n-i}$ | — | $f(x) g(x)$ | $\le d + e$ |
| Left shift $Ls$ | $(Ls)_n = s_{n+1}$ | — | $\frac{f(x) - s_0}{x}$ | $\le d$ |
| Right shift $Rs$ | $$(Rs)_n = \begin{cases}s_{n-1} &n \ge 1\\0 &n = 0\end{cases}$$ | — | $x f(x)$ | $\le d + 1$ |
| Cauchy inverse $s^{(-1)}$ | $(s^{(-1)})_n = \sum_{{i_1 + \dots + i_k = n} \atop {i_1, \ldots, i_k \ne 0}} (-1)^k s_{i_1} s_{i_2} \cdots s_{i_k}$ | $s_0 = 1$ | $\frac{1}{f(x)}$ | $\le d + 1$ |
| Kleene star $s^{(*)}$ | $(s^{(*)})_n = \sum_{{i_1 + \dots + i_k = n} \atop {i_1, \ldots, i_k \ne 0}} s_{i_1} s_{i_2} \cdots s_{i_k}$ | $s_0 = 0$ | $\frac{1}{1 - f(x)}$ | $\le d + 1$ |

The closure under term-wise addition and multiplication follows from the closed-form characterization in terms of exponential polynomials. The closure under Cauchy product follows from the generating function characterization. The requirement $s_0 = 1$ for Cauchy inverse is necessary for the case of integer sequences, but can be replaced by $s_0 \ne 0$ if the sequence is over any field (rational, algebraic, real, or complex numbers).

== Behavior ==
Unsolved problem in mathematics
Is there an algorithm to test whether a constant-recursive sequence has a zero?
More unsolved problems in mathematics

=== Zeros ===
Despite satisfying a simple local formula, a constant-recursive sequence can exhibit complicated global behavior. Define a zero of a constant-recursive sequence to be a nonnegative integer $n$ such that $s_n = 0$. The Skolem–Mahler–Lech theorem states that the zeros of the sequence are eventually repeating: there exists constants $M$ and $N$ such that for all $n > M$, $s_n = 0$ if and only if $s_{n+N} = 0$. This result holds for a constant-recursive sequence over the complex numbers, or more generally, over any field of characteristic zero.

=== Decision problems ===
The pattern of zeros in a constant-recursive sequence can also be investigated from the perspective of computability theory. To do so, the description of the sequence $s_n$ must be given a finite description; this can be done if the sequence is over the integers, rational numbers, or algebraic numbers. Given such an encoding for sequences $s_n$, the following problems can be studied:

Notable decision problems
| Problem | Description | Status |
|---|---|---|
| Existence of a zero (Skolem problem) | On input $(s_n)_{n=0}^\infty$, is $s_n = 0$ for some $n$? | Open |
| Infinitely many zeros | On input $(s_n)_{n=0}^\infty$, is $s_n = 0$ for infinitely many $n$? | Decidable |
| Eventually all zero | On input $(s_n)_{n=0}^\infty$, is $s_n = 0$ for all sufficiently large $n$? | Decidable |
| Positivity | On input $(s_n)_{n=0}^\infty$, is $s_n > 0$ for all $n$? | Open |
| Eventual positivity | On input $(s_n)_{n=0}^\infty$, is $s_n > 0$ for all sufficiently large $n$? | Open |

Because the square of a constant-recursive sequence $s_n^2$ is still constant-recursive (see closure properties), the existence-of-a-zero problem in the table above reduces to positivity, and infinitely-many-zeros reduces to eventual positivity. Other problems also reduce to those in the above table: for example, whether $s_n = c$ for some $n$ reduces to existence-of-a-zero for the sequence $s_n - c$. As a second example, for sequences in the real numbers, weak positivity (is $s_n \ge 0$ for all $n$?) reduces to positivity of the sequence $-s_n$ (because the answer must be negated, this is a Turing reduction).

The Skolem-Mahler-Lech theorem would provide answers to some of these questions, except that its proof is non-constructive. It states that for all $n > M$, the zeros are repeating; however, the value of $M$ is not known to be computable, so this does not lead to a solution to the existence-of-a-zero problem. On the other hand, the exact pattern which repeats after $n > M$ is computable. This is why the infinitely-many-zeros problem is decidable: just determine if the infinitely-repeating pattern is empty.

Decidability results are known when the order of a sequence is restricted to be small. For example, the Skolem problem is decidable for algebraic sequences of order up to 4. It is also known to be decidable for reversible integer sequences up to order 7, that is, sequences that may be continued backwards in the integers.

Decidability results are also known under the assumption of certain unproven conjectures in number theory. For example, decidability is known for rational sequences of order up to 5 subject to a conjecture known as Skolem's conjecture or the exponential local-global principle. Decidability is also known for all simple rational sequences (those with simple characteristic polynomial) subject to the Skolem conjecture and the weak p-adic Schanuel conjecture.

=== Degeneracy ===
Let $r_1, \ldots, r_n$ be the characteristic roots of a constant recursive sequence $s$. We say that the sequence is degenerate if the ratio $r_i/r_j$ is a root of unity, for any $i \neq j$. It is often easier to study non-degenerate sequences, and one can reduce to this using the following theorem: if $s$ has order $d$ and is contained in a number field $K$ of degree $k$ over $\mathbb Q$, then there is a constant
$$M(k,d) \leq \begin{cases} \exp(2d (3\log d)^{1/2}) & \text{if } k = 1, \\ 2^{kd+1} & \text{if } k \geq 2 \end{cases}$$

such that for some $M \leq M(k,d)$ each subsequence $s_{Mn+\ell}$ is either identically zero or non-degenerate.

== Generalizations ==
A D-finite or holonomic sequence is a natural generalization where the coefficients of the recurrence are allowed to be polynomial functions of $n$ rather than constants.

A $k$-regular sequence satisfies a linear recurrences with constant coefficients, but the recurrences take a different form. Rather than $s_n$ being a linear combination of $s_m$ for some integers $m$ that are close to $n$, each term $s_n$ in a $k$-regular sequence is a linear combination of $s_m$ for some integers $m$ whose base-$k$ representations are close to that of $n$. Constant-recursive sequences can be thought of as $1$-regular sequences, where the base-1 representation of $n$ consists of $n$ copies of the digit $1$.
