= Rational difference equation =

In mathematics, a rational difference equation is a nonlinear difference equation of the form
$$x_{n+1} = \frac{\alpha+\sum_{i=0}^k \beta_ix_{n-i}}{A+\sum_{i=0}^k B_ix_{n-i}}~,$$
where the initial conditions $x_{0}, x_{-1},\dots, x_{-k}$ are such that the denominator never vanishes for any n.

== First-order rational difference equation ==
A first-order rational difference equation is a nonlinear difference equation of the form

$w_{t+1} = \frac{aw_t+b}{cw_t+d}.$	2

When $a,b,c,d$ and the initial condition $w_0$ are real numbers, this difference equation is called a Riccati difference equation. Their theory is closely related to the theory of Möbius transforms.

Such an equation can be solved by writing $w_t$ as a nonlinear transformation of another variable $x_t$ which itself evolves linearly. Then standard methods can be used to solve the linear difference equation in $x_t$.

In natural resource sciences and theoretical ecology, the special case of $b=0$ is known as the Beverton-Holt model of population growth, and is important in fisheries management.

Equations of this form arise from the infinite resistor ladder problem.

=== Solving a first-order equation ===
==== First approach ====
Without loss of generality, the determinant-like quantity $ad-bc\neq0$, and this can be easily seen by noting that, with a division on both the numerator and denominator in Equation (2), you can always set $c=1$, in which case, if $ad-bc=0$, then the numerator and denominator will cancel away, leaving no difference equation left, being instead so completely reduced as to become exactly the constant $a$. Thus, one approach to developing the transformed variable $x_t$, is to write
$$y_{t+1}= \alpha - \frac{\beta}{y_t}$$
where $\alpha = (a+d)/c$ and $\beta = (ad-bc)/c^{2}$ and where $w_t = y_t -d/c$.

Further writing $y_t = x_{t+1}/x_t$ can be shown to yield
$$x_{t+2} - \alpha x_{t+1} + \beta x_t = 0.$$

==== Second approach ====
The above approach is already of general applicability. This following approach gives a first-order difference equation for $x_t$ instead of a second-order one. Let $r^2=(d-a)^2+4bc$. For the case that $r^2 \geqslant 0$, every term will be real-valued and this method may be convenient to use. Otherwise, the method still works, but complex numbers will appear, and it might be more convenient to attempt a trigonometric ansatz instead. Substituting $x_t=1/(\eta+w_t)$, which implies $w_t=(1-\eta x_t)/x_t$, into Equation (2), we find that it is always possible to make $x_t$ evolve according to the simple inhomogeneous first-order linear difference equation
$$x_{t+1} = \left(\frac{d-\eta c}{\eta c+a}\right)\!x_t + \frac{c}{\eta c+a}.$$
by choosing $\eta$ such that $c\eta^2-(d-a)\eta-b = 0$, and it is clear that this can always be done in either of the two choices $\eta_\pm = \frac{d-a\pm r}{2c}$, even when $r \in \mathbb C$.

==== Third approach ====
The equation

$$w_{t+1} = \frac{aw_t+b}{cw_t+d}$$

can also be solved by treating it as a special case of the more general matrix equation

$$X_{t+1} = -(E+BX_t)(C+AX_t)^{-1},$$

where all of A, B, C, E, and X are n × n matrices (in this case n = 1); the solution of this is

$$X_t = N_tD_t^{-1}$$

where

$$\begin{pmatrix} N_{t} \\ D_{t}\end{pmatrix} = \begin{pmatrix} -B & -E \\ A & C \end{pmatrix}^t\begin{pmatrix} X_0\\ I \end{pmatrix}.$$

== Application ==
It was shown in that a dynamic matrix Riccati equation of the form

$$H_{t-1} = K +A'H_tA - A'H_tC(C'H_tC)^{-1}C'H_tA,$$

which can arise in some discrete-time optimal control problems, can be solved using the second approach above if the matrix C has only one more row than column.
