= Thoralf Skolem =

Norwegian mathematician

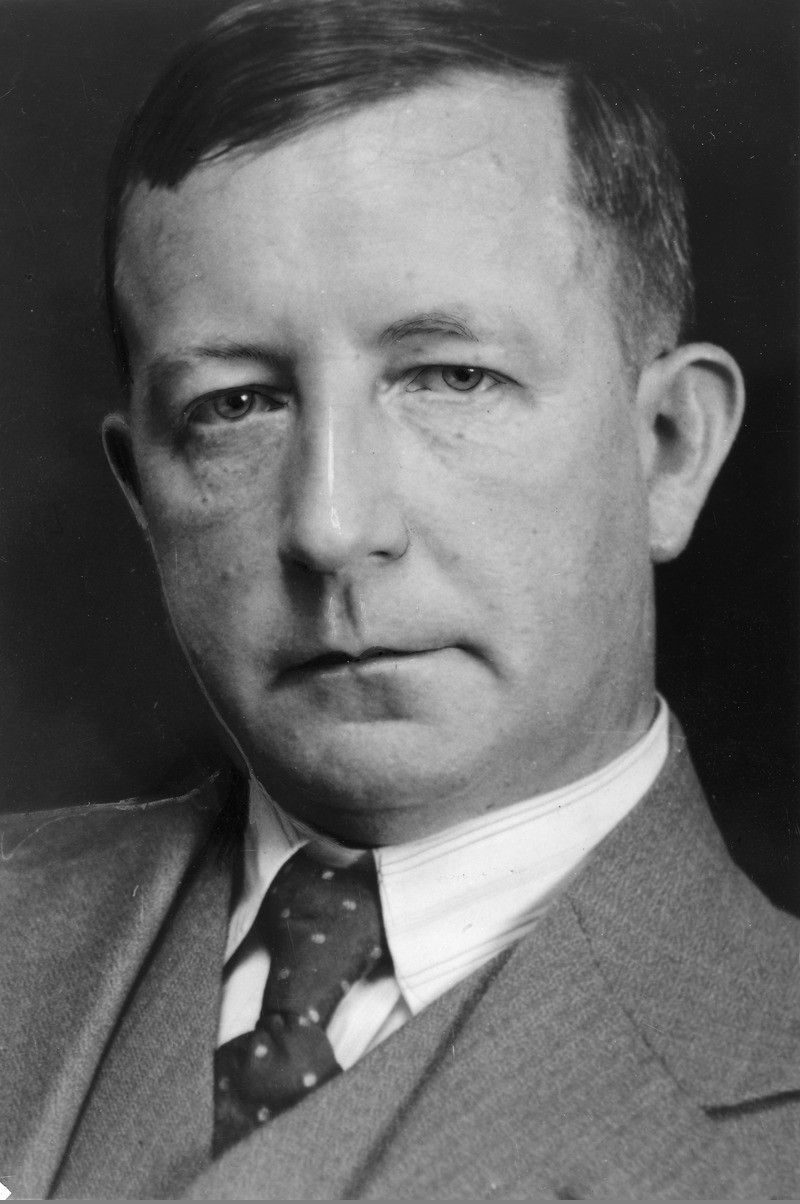
- Born: 23 May 1887; Sandsvær, Norway
- Died: 23 March 1963 (aged 75); Oslo, Norway
- Education: Oslo University
- Known for: Skolem–Noether theorem; Löwenheim–Skolem theorem
- Scientific career
- Fields: Mathematician
- Workplaces: Oslo University; Chr. Michelsen Institute
- Doctoral advisor: Axel Thue
- Doctoral students: Øystein Ore

Thoralf Albert Skolem (Norwegian: [ˈtûːrɑɫf ˈskûːlɛm]; 23 May 1887 – 23 March 1963) was a Norwegian mathematician who worked in mathematical logic, set theory, and number theory.

== Life ==
Although Skolem's father was a primary school teacher, most of his extended family were farmers. Skolem attended secondary school in Kristiania (later renamed Oslo), passing the university entrance examinations in 1905. He then entered Det Kongelige Frederiks Universitet to study mathematics, also taking courses in physics, chemistry, zoology and botany.

In 1909, he began working as an assistant to the physicist Kristian Birkeland, known for bombarding magnetized spheres with electrons and obtaining aurora-like effects; thus Skolem's first publications were physics papers written jointly with Birkeland. In 1913, Skolem passed the state examinations with distinction, and completed a dissertation titled Investigations on the Algebra of Logic. He also traveled with Birkeland to the Sudan to observe the zodiacal light. He spent the winter semester of 1915 at the University of Göttingen, at the time the leading research center in mathematical logic, metamathematics, and abstract algebra, fields in which Skolem eventually excelled. In 1916 he was appointed a research fellow at Det Kongelige Frederiks Universitet. In 1918, he became a Docent in Mathematics and was elected to the Norwegian Academy of Science and Letters.

Skolem did not at first formally enroll as a Ph.D. candidate, believing that the Ph.D. was unnecessary in Norway. He later changed his mind and submitted a thesis in 1926, titled Some theorems about integral solutions to certain algebraic equations and inequalities. His notional thesis advisor was Axel Thue, even though Thue had died in 1922.

In 1927, he married Edith Wilhelmine Hasvold.

Skolem continued to teach at Det kongelige Frederiks Universitet (renamed the University of Oslo in 1939) until 1930 when he became a Research Associate in Chr. Michelsen Institute in Bergen. This senior post allowed Skolem to conduct research free of administrative and teaching duties. However, the position also required that he reside in Bergen, a city which then lacked a university and hence had no research library, so that he was unable to keep abreast of the mathematical literature. In 1938, he returned to Oslo to assume the Professorship of Mathematics at the university. There he taught the graduate courses in algebra and number theory, and only occasionally on mathematical logic. Skolem's Ph.D. student Øystein Ore went on to a career in the USA.

Skolem served as president of the Norwegian Mathematical Society, and edited the Norsk Matematisk Tidsskrift ("The Norwegian Mathematical Journal") for many years. He was also the founding editor of Mathematica Scandinavica.

After his 1957 retirement, he made several trips to the United States, speaking and teaching at universities there. He remained intellectually active until his sudden and unexpected death.

For more on Skolem's academic life, see Fenstad (1970).

== Mathematics ==
Skolem published around 180 papers on Diophantine equations, group theory, lattice theory, and, set theory and mathematical logic, with some 50 papers in the last two topics. He mostly published in Norwegian journals with limited international circulation, so that his results were occasionally rediscovered by others. An example is the Skolem–Noether theorem, characterizing the automorphisms of simple algebras. Skolem published a proof in 1927, but Emmy Noether independently rediscovered it a few years later.

Skolem was among the first to write on lattices. In 1912, he was the first to describe a free distributive lattice generated by n elements. In 1919, he showed that every implicative lattice (now also called a Skolem lattice) is distributive and, as a partial converse, that every finite distributive lattice is implicative. Skolem in these works used the terminology of Ernst Schröder's algebraic logic with the effect that his results were not understood. By 1919, he had defined Heyting algebras under the name Gruppenkalkül and established its basic properties, thus anticipating intuitionistic propositional logic. After some of his results were rediscovered by others, Skolem published a 1936 paper "Über gewisse 'Verbände' oder 'Lattices'" in German, surveying his earlier work in lattice theory, but this paper was not well received by those whose work he had anticipated. It was found out in the early 1990's that Skolem's paper of 1920, with the enormously long title Logisch-kombinatorische Untersuchungen über die Erfüllbarkeit oder Beweisbarkeit mathematischer Sätze, nebst einem Theorem über dichte Mengen, contained a polynomial-time decision method for the word problem for freely generated lattices, a result otherwise known only since 1988.

Skolem was a pioneer model theorist. In 1920, in the mentioned long-titled article, he greatly simplified the proof of a theorem Leopold Löwenheim first proved in 1915, resulting in the Löwenheim–Skolem theorem, which states that if a countable first-order theory has an infinite model, then it has a countable model. His 1920 proof employed the axiom of choice, but he later (1922 and 1928) gave proofs using Kőnig's lemma in place of that axiom. It is notable that Skolem, like Löwenheim, wrote on mathematical logic and set theory employing the notation of his fellow pioneering model theorists Charles Sanders Peirce and Ernst Schröder, including Π, Σ as variable-binding quantifiers, in contrast to the notations of Peano, Principia Mathematica, and Principles of Mathematical Logic.

In 1919, Skolem read the Principia Mathematica but was not satisfied with one aspect of Russell's treatment, namely the universal and existential quantification over infinite domains. His answer was to develop primitive recursive arithmetic. His paper, again with a long title, is: Begründung der elementary Arithmetic durch die rekurrierende Denkweise ohne Anwendung scheinbarer Veränderlichen mit unendlichem Ausdehnungsbereich. (A foundation for elementary arithmetic through the recurrent mode of thought, without the use of bound variables over an infinite domain.) This paper got published only in 1923, after having been rejected by the premier Stockholm-based journal Acta Mathematica, an event that embittered Skolem greatly, as did the appropriation of his discovery by David Hilbert. Failed acknowledgement of his work in the Scandinavian countries led him to work for many years mainly on Diophantine problems.

In 1929, Skolem anticipated Gödel's incompleteness theorem of 1931, writing:

It would be an interesting task to show that every collection of propositions about the natural numbers, formulated in first-order logic, continues to hold when one makes certain changes in the meaning of "numbers."

After Gödel's publication, Skolem carried through the result anticipated in 1929, by the construction of non-standard models of arithmetic and set theory.

Skolem (1922) refined Zermelo's axioms for set theory by replacing Zermelo's vague notion of a "definite" property with any property that can be coded in first-order logic. The resulting axiom is now part of the standard axioms of set theory. Skolem also pointed out that a consequence of the Löwenheim–Skolem theorem is what is now known as Skolem's paradox: If Zermelo's axioms are consistent, then they must be satisfiable within a countable domain, even though they prove the existence of uncountable sets.

== Completeness ==
The completeness of first-order logic is a corollary of results Skolem proved in the early 1920s and discussed in Skolem (1928), but he failed to note this fact, perhaps because mathematicians and logicians did not become fully aware of completeness as a fundamental metamathematical problem until the 1928 first edition of Hilbert and Ackermann's Principles of Mathematical Logic clearly articulated it. In any event, Kurt Gödel first proved this completeness in 1930.

Skolem distrusted the completed infinite and was one of the founders of finitism in mathematics. Skolem (1923) sets out his primitive recursive arithmetic, a very early contribution to the theory of computable functions, as a means of avoiding the so-called paradoxes of the infinite. Here he developed the arithmetic of the natural numbers by first defining objects by primitive recursion, then devising another system to prove properties of the objects defined by the first system. These two systems enabled him to define prime numbers and to set out a considerable amount of number theory. If the first of these systems can be considered as a programming language for defining objects, and the second as a programming logic for proving properties about the objects, Skolem can be seen as an unwitting pioneer of theoretical computer science.

In 1929, Presburger proved that Peano arithmetic without multiplication was consistent, complete, and decidable. The following year, Skolem proved that the same was true of Peano arithmetic without addition, a system named Skolem arithmetic in his honor. Gödel's famous 1931 result is that Peano arithmetic itself (with both addition and multiplication) is incompletable and hence a posteriori undecidable.

Hao Wang praised Skolem's work as follows:

Skolem tends to treat general problems by concrete examples. He often seemed to present proofs in the same order as he came to discover them. This results in a fresh informality as well as a certain inconclusiveness. Many of his papers strike one as progress reports. Yet his ideas are often pregnant and potentially capable of wide application. He was very much a 'free spirit': he did not belong to any school, he did not found a school of his own, he did not usually make heavy use of known results... he was very much an innovator and most of his papers can be read and understood by those without much specialized knowledge. It seems quite likely that if he were young today, logic... would not have appealed to him. (Skolem 1970: 17-18)

For more on Skolem's accomplishments, see Hao Wang (1970).

== See also ==
- Leopold Löwenheim
- Model theory
- Skolem arithmetic
- Skolem normal form
- Skolem's paradox
- Skolem problem
- Skolem sequence
- Skolem–Mahler–Lech theorem
