= Meini =

Meini is an Italian surname. Notable people with the surname include:

- Beatrice Meini (born 1968), Italian mathematician
- Ettore Meini (1903–1961), Italian bicycle racer
- Mario Meini (born 1946), Italian Catholic bishop
