= Word problem =

Word problem may refer to:

- Word problem (mathematics education), a type of textbook exercise or exam question to have students apply abstract mathematical concepts to real-world situations
- Word problem (mathematics), a decision problem for algebraic identities in mathematics and computer science
- Word problem for groups, the problem of recognizing the identity element in a finitely presented group
- Word problem (computability), a decision problem concerning formal languages
- "Word Problems", an instrumental by Deadmau5 from the 2009 album For Lack of a Better Name
- Word Problems (book), a 2021 poetry book by Ian Williams

== See also ==
- Word-finding problem; problem using words; language problem: aphasia (disambiguation)
- Word game
  - Wordle
