= Arithmetico-geometric sequence =

Mathematical sequence satisfying a specific pattern

In mathematics, an arithmetico-geometric sequence is the result of element-by-element multiplication of the elements of a geometric progression with the corresponding elements of an arithmetic progression. The nth element of an arithmetico-geometric sequence is the product of the nth element of an arithmetic sequence and the nth element of a geometric sequence. An arithmetico-geometric series is a sum of terms that are the elements of an arithmetico-geometric sequence. Arithmetico-geometric sequences and series arise in various applications, such as the computation of expected values in probability theory, especially in Bernoulli processes.

For instance, the sequence

$$\frac{\color{blue}{0}}{\color{green}{1}}, \ \frac{\color{blue}{1}}{\color{green}{2}}, \ \frac{\color{blue}{2}}{\color{green}{4}}, \ \frac{\color{blue}{3}}{\color{green}{8}}, \ \frac{\color{blue}{4}}{\color{green}{16}}, \ \frac{\color{blue}{5}}{\color{green}{32}}, \cdots$$

is an arithmetico-geometric sequence. The arithmetic component appears in the numerator (in blue), and the geometric one in the denominator (in green). The series summation of the infinite elements of this sequence has been called Gabriel's staircase and it has a value of 2. In general,

$$\sum_{k=1}^{\infty} {\color{blue} k} {\color{green} r^k} = \frac{r}{(1 - r)^2} \quad \text{for }-1<r<1.$$

The label of arithmetico-geometric sequence may also be given to different objects combining characteristics of both arithmetic and geometric sequences. For instance, the French notion of arithmetico-geometric sequence refers to sequences that satisfy recurrence relations of the form $u_{n+1}=r u_n+ d$, which combine the defining recurrence relations $u_{n+1}=u_n+d$ for arithmetic sequences and $u_{n+1}= r u_n$ for geometric sequences. These sequences are therefore solutions to a special class of linear difference equation: inhomogeneous first order linear recurrences with constant coefficients.

== Elements ==
The elements of an arithmetico-geometric sequence $(A_n G_n)_{n \geq 1}$ are the products of the elements of an arithmetic progression $(A_n)_{n \geq 1}$ (in blue) with initial value $a$ and common difference $d$, $A_n = a + (n - 1)d,$ with the corresponding elements of a geometric progression $(G_n)_{n \geq 1}$ (in green) with initial value $b$ and common ratio $r$, $G_n = b r^{n-1},$ so that

$$\begin{align}
A_1 G_1 & =\color{blue}a \color{green}b \\
A_2 G_2 & =\color{blue}(a+d) \color{green}br \\
A_3 G_3 & =\color{blue}(a+2d)\color{green} br^2 \\
& \ \,\vdots \\
A_n G_n & =\color{blue}\bigl(a+(n-1)d \bigr)\color{green} br^{n-1}\color{black}.
\end{align}$$

These four parameters are somewhat redundant and can be reduced to three: $ab,$ $bd,$ and $r.$

=== Example ===
The sequence

$$\frac{\color{blue}{0}}{\color{green}{1}}, \ \frac{\color{blue}{1}}{\color{green}{2}}, \ \frac{\color{blue}{2}}{\color{green}{4}}, \ \frac{\color{blue}{3}}{\color{green}{8}}, \ \frac{\color{blue}{4}}{\color{green}{16}}, \ \frac{\color{blue}{5}}{\color{green}{32}}, \cdots$$

is the arithmetico-geometric sequence with parameters $d=b=1$, $a=0$, and $r=\tfrac12$.

== Series ==
=== Partial sums ===
The sum of the first n terms of an arithmetico-geometric series has the form

$$\begin{align}
S_n & = \sum_{k = 1}^n A_k G_k \\[5pt]
& = \sum_{k = 1}^n \bigl(a + (k - 1) d\bigr) br^{k - 1} \\[5pt]
& = b \sum_{k = 0}^{n-1} \left(a + k d\right) r^{k} \\[5pt]
& = ab + (a + d) br + (a + 2 d) br^2 + \cdots + \bigl(a + (n - 1) d\bigr) br^{n - 1}
\end{align}$$

where $A_i$ and $G_i$ are the ith elements of the arithmetic and the geometric sequence, respectively.

This partial sum has the closed-form expression

$$\begin{align}
S_n & = \frac{ab - (a+nd)\,br^n}{1 - r}+\frac{dbr\,(1 - r^n)}{(1-r)^2}\\
& = \frac{A_1G_1 - A_{n+1}G_{n+1}}{1 - r}+\frac{dr}{(1-r)^2}\,(G_1 - G_{n+1}).
\end{align}$$

==== Derivation ====
Multiplying

$$S_n = ab + (a + d) br + (a + 2 d) br^2 + \cdots + \bigl(a + (n - 1) d\bigr) br^{n - 1}$$

by r gives

$$r S_n = a br + (a + d) br^2 + (a + 2 d) br^3 + \cdots + \bigl(a + (n - 1) d\bigr) br^n.$$

Subtracting rS_{n} from S_{n}, dividing both sides by $b$, and using the technique of telescoping series (second equality) and the formula for the sum of a finite geometric series (fifth equality) gives

$$\begin{align}
\frac{(1 - r) S_n}{b} &= \left(a + (a + d) r + (a + 2 d) r^2 + \cdots + \bigl(a + (n - 1) d\bigr) r^{n - 1}\right) - \Bigl(a r + (a + d) r^2 + (a + 2 d) r^3 + \cdots + \bigl(a + (n - 1) d\bigr) r^n\Bigr) \\[5pt]
&= a + d \left(r + r^2 + \cdots + r^{n-1}\right) - \bigl(a + (n - 1) d\bigr) r^n \\[5pt]
&= a + d \left(r + r^2 + \cdots + r^{n-1}+r^n\right) - \left(a + n d\right) r^n \\[5pt]
&= a + d r \left(1 + r + r^2 + \cdots + r^{n-1}\right) - \left(a + nd\right) r^n \\[5pt]
&= a + \frac{d r (1 - r^n)}{1 - r} - (a + nd) r^n, \\[8pt]
S_n &= \frac{b}{1-r} \left( a - (a + nd) r^n + \frac{d r (1 - r^n)}{1 - r} \right) \\[5pt]
&= \frac{ab - (a + nd) b r^n}{1-r} + \frac{d r (b - br^n)}{(1 - r)^2} \\[5pt]
&= \frac{A_1 G_1 - A_{n+1} G_{n+1}}{1-r} + \frac{d r (G_1 - G_{n+1})}{(1 - r)^2}
\end{align}$$

as claimed.

=== Infinite series ===
If −1 < r < 1, then the sum S of the arithmetico-geometric series, that is to say, the limit of the partial sums of the elements of the sequence, is given by

$$\begin{align}
S &= \sum_{k = 1}^\infty t_k = \lim_{n \to \infty}S_{n} \\[5pt]
&= \frac{ab}{1-r}+\frac{dbr}{(1-r)^2}\\[5pt]
&= \frac{A_1G_1}{1 - r}+\frac{d r G_1}{(1-r)^2}.
\end{align}$$

If r is outside of the above range, b is not zero, and a and d are not both zero, the limit does not exist and the series is divergent.

=== Example ===
The sum

$$S=\frac{\color{blue}{0}}{\color{green}{1}}+\frac{\color{blue}{1}}{\color{green}{2}}+\frac{\color{blue}{2}}{\color{green}{4}}+\frac{\color{blue}{3}}{\color{green}{8}}+\frac{\color{blue}{4}}{\color{green}{16}}+\frac{\color{blue}{5}}{\color{green}{32}}+\cdots$$,

is the sum of an arithmetico-geometric series defined by $d=b=1$, $a=0$, and $r=\tfrac 12$, and it converges to $S=2$. This sequence corresponds to the expected number of coin tosses required to obtain "tails". The probability $T_k$ of obtaining tails for the first time at the kth toss is as follows:

$$T_1=\frac 1{2}, \ T_2=\frac 1{4},\dots, T_k = \frac 1{2^k}$$.

Therefore, the expected number of tosses to reach the first "tails" is given by

$$\sum_{k=1}^{\infty} k T_k = \sum_{k=1}^{\infty} \frac {\color{blue}k}{\color{green}2^k} = 2.$$

Similarly, the sum

$$S=\frac{\color{blue}{0} \cdot \color{green}\frac16}{\color{green}\frac56}+\frac{\color{blue}{1} \cdot \color{green}\frac16}{\color{green}{1}}+\frac{\color{blue}{2} \cdot \color{green}\frac16}{\color{green}{\frac65}}+\frac{\color{blue}{3} \cdot \color{green}\frac16}{\color{green}{\left(\frac65\right)^2}}+\frac{\color{blue}{4} \cdot \color{green}\frac16}{\color{green}{\left(\frac65\right)^3}}+\frac{\color{blue}{5} \cdot \color{green}\frac16}{\color{green}{\left(\frac65\right)^4}}+\cdots$$

is the sum of an arithmetico-geometric series defined by $d = 1$, $a = 0$, $b = \tfrac{1/6}{5/6} = \tfrac15$, and $r = \tfrac56$, and it converges to 6. This sequence corresponds to the expected number of six-sided dice rolls required to obtain a specific value on a die roll, for instance "5". In general, these series with $d = 1$, $a = 0$, $b = \tfrac{p}{1 - p}$, and $r = 1-p$ give the expectations of "the number of trials until first success" in Bernoulli processes with "success probability" $p$. The probabilities of each outcome follow a geometric distribution and provide the geometric sequence factors in the terms of the series, while the number of trials per outcome provides the arithmetic sequence factors in the terms.
