= Arithmetic progression =

Sequence of equally spaced numbers

Proof without words of the arithmetic progression formulas using a rotated copy of the blocks.

An arithmetic progression, arithmetic sequence or linear sequence is a sequence of numbers such that the difference from any succeeding term to its preceding term remains constant throughout the sequence. The constant difference is called common difference of that arithmetic progression. For instance, the sequence 5, 7, 9, 11, 13, 15, ... is an arithmetic progression with a common difference of 2.

If the initial term of an arithmetic progression is $a_1$ and the common difference of successive members is $d$, then the $n$-th term of the sequence ($a_n$) is given by
$$a_n = a_1 + (n - 1)d.$$

A finite portion of an arithmetic progression is called a finite arithmetic progression and sometimes just called an arithmetic progression. The sum of a finite arithmetic progression is called an arithmetic series.

== History ==
According to an anecdote of uncertain reliability, in primary school Carl Friedrich Gauss reinvented the formula $\tfrac{n(n+1)}{2}$ for summing the integers from 1 through $n$, for the case $n=100$, by grouping the numbers from both ends of the sequence into pairs summing to 101 and multiplying by the number of pairs. Regardless of the truth of this story, Gauss was not the first to discover this formula. Similar rules were known in antiquity to Archimedes, Hypsicles and Diophantus; in China to Zhang Qiujian; in India to Aryabhata, Brahmagupta and Bhaskara II; and in medieval Europe to Alcuin, Dicuil, Fibonacci, Sacrobosco, and anonymous commentators of Talmud known as Tosafists. Some find it likely that its origin goes back to the Pythagoreans in the 5th century BC.

== Sum ==
2	+	5	+	8	+	11	+	14	=	40
14	+	11	+	8	+	5	+	2	=	40
16	+	16	+	16	+	16	+	16	=	80

Computation of the sum 2 + 5 + 8 + 11 + 14. When the sequence is reversed and added to itself term by term, the resulting sequence has a single repeated value in it, equal to the sum of the first and last numbers (2 + 14 = 16). Thus 16 × 5 = 80 is twice the sum.

The sum of the members of a finite arithmetic progression is called an arithmetic series. For example, consider the sum:

$$2 + 5 + 8 + 11 + 14 = 40$$

This sum can be found quickly by taking the number n of terms being added (here 5), multiplying by the sum of the first and last number in the progression (here 2 + 14 = 16), and dividing by 2:

$$\frac{n(a_1 + a_n)}{2}$$

In the case above, this gives the equation:

$$2 + 5 + 8 + 11 + 14 = \frac{5(2 + 14)}{2} = \frac{5 \times 16}{2} = 40.$$

This formula works for any arithmetic progression of real numbers beginning with $a_1$ and ending with $a_n$. For example,

$$\left(-\frac{3}{2}\right) + \left(-\frac{1}{2}\right) + \frac{1}{2} = \frac{3\left(-\frac{3}{2} + \frac{1}{2}\right)}{2} = -\frac{3}{2}.$$

=== Derivation ===
Animated proof for the formula giving the sum of the first integers 1+2+...+n.

To derive the above formula, begin by expressing the arithmetic series in two different ways:

$$S_n=a+a_2+a_3+\dots+a_{(n-1)} +a_n$$
$$S_n=a+(a+d)+(a+2d)+\dots+(a+(n-2)d)+(a+(n-1)d).$$

Rewriting the terms in reverse order:
$$S_n=(a+(n-1)d)+(a+(n-2)d)+\dots+(a+2d)+(a+d)+a.$$

Adding the corresponding terms of both sides of the two equations and halving both sides:
$$S_n=\frac{n}{2}[2a + (n-1)d].$$
This formula can be simplified as:
$$\begin{align}
S_n &=\frac{n}{2}[a + a + (n-1)d].\\
&=\frac{n}{2}(a+a_n).\\
&=\frac{n}{2}(\text{initial term}+\text{last term}).
\end{align}$$
Furthermore, the mean value of the series can be calculated via: $S_n / n$:
$$\overline{a} =\frac{a_1 + a_n}{2}.$$

The formula is essentially the same as the formula for the mean of a discrete uniform distribution, interpreting the arithmetic progression as a set of equally probable outcomes.

== Product ==
The product of the members of a finite arithmetic progression with an initial element a_{1}, common differences d, and n elements in total is determined in a closed expression
$$\begin{align}
a_1 a_2 a_3 \cdots a_n &= a_1 (a_1+d) (a_1+2d) \cdots (a_1+(n-1)d) \\[1ex]
&= \prod_{k=0}^{n-1} (a_1+kd)
= d^n \frac{\Gamma{\left(\frac{a_1}{d} + n\right)}}{\Gamma{\left( \frac{a_1}{d} \right)}}
\end{align}$$
where $\Gamma$ denotes the Gamma function. The formula is not valid when $a_1/d$ is negative or zero.

This is a generalization of the facts that the product of the progression $1 \times 2 \times \cdots \times n$ is given by the factorial $n!$ and that the product
$$m \times (m+1) \times (m+2) \times \cdots \times (n-2) \times (n-1) \times n$$
for positive integers $m$ and $n$ is given by
$$\frac{n!}{(m-1)!}.$$

=== Derivation ===
$$\begin{align}
a_1a_2a_3\cdots a_n &=\prod_{k=0}^{n-1} (a_1+kd) \\[2pt]
&= \prod_{k=0}^{n-1} d\left(\frac{a_1}{d}+k\right) \\[2pt]
&= d \left (\frac{a_1}{d}\right) d \left (\frac{a_1}{d}+1 \right )d \left ( \frac{a_1}{d}+2 \right )\cdots d \left ( \frac{a_1}{d}+(n-1) \right ) \\[2pt]
&= d^n\prod_{k=0}^{n-1} \left(\frac{a_1}{d}+k\right)=d^n {\left(\frac{a_1}{d}\right)}^{\overline{n}}
\end{align}$$
where $x^{\overline{n}}$ denotes the rising factorial.

By the recurrence formula $\Gamma(z+1)=z\Gamma(z)$, valid for a complex number $z>0$,

$$\Gamma(z+2)=(z+1)\Gamma(z+1)=(z+1)z\Gamma(z)$$,

$$\Gamma(z+3)=(z+2)\Gamma(z+2)=(z+2)(z+1)z\Gamma(z)$$,

so that
$$\frac{\Gamma(z+m)}{\Gamma(z)} = \prod_{k=0}^{m-1}(z+k)$$
for $m$ a positive integer and $z$ a positive complex number.

Thus, if $a_1/d > 0$,
$$\prod_{k=0}^{n-1} \left(\frac{a_1}{d}+k\right)= \frac{\Gamma{\left(\frac{a_1}{d} + n\right)}}{\Gamma{\left( \frac{a_1}{d} \right)}},$$
and, finally,
$$a_1a_2a_3\cdots a_n = d^n\prod_{k=0}^{n-1} \left(\frac{a_1}{d}+k\right) = d^n \frac{\Gamma{\left(\frac{a_1}{d} + n\right)}}{\Gamma{\left( \frac{a_1}{d} \right)}}$$

=== Examples ===
==== Example 1 ====
In the example $3, 8, 13, 18, 23, 28, \ldots$, the product of the terms of the arithmetic progression given by $a_n = 3 + 5(n-1)$ up to the 50th term is
$$P_{50} = 5^{50} \cdot \frac{\Gamma \left(3/5 + 50\right) }{\Gamma \left( 3 / 5 \right) } \approx 3.78438 \times 10^{98}.$$

==== Example 2 ====
The product of the first 10 odd numbers $(1,3,5,7,9,11,13,15,17,19)$ is given by
$$1\cdot 3\cdot 5\cdots 19 =\prod_{k=0}^{9} (1+2k) = 2^{10} \cdot \frac{\Gamma \left(\frac{1}{2} + 10\right) }{\Gamma \left( \frac{1}{2} \right) } = 654,729,075$$

== Standard deviation ==
The standard deviation of any arithmetic progression is
$$\sigma = |d|\sqrt{\frac{(n-1)(n+1)}{12}}$$
where $n$ is the number of terms in the progression and $d$ is the common difference between terms. The formula is essentially the same as the formula for the standard deviation of a discrete uniform distribution, interpreting the arithmetic progression as a set of equally probable outcomes.

== Intersections ==
The intersection of any two doubly infinite arithmetic progressions is either empty or another arithmetic progression, which can be found using the Chinese remainder theorem. If each pair of progressions in a family of doubly infinite arithmetic progressions have a non-empty intersection, then there exists a number common to all of them; that is, infinite arithmetic progressions form a Helly family. However, the intersection of infinitely many infinite arithmetic progressions might be a single number rather than itself being an infinite progression.

== Amount of arithmetic subsets of length k of the set {1,...,n} ==
Let $a(n,k)$ denote the number of arithmetic subsets of length $k$ one can make from the set $\{1,\cdots,n\}$ and let $\phi(\eta, \kappa)$ be defined as:

$$\phi(\eta, \kappa) = \begin{cases}
0 & \text{if } \kappa \mid \eta \\
\left( \left[ \eta \; (\text{mod } \kappa) \right] -2 \right) \left( \kappa - \left[ \eta \; (\text{mod } \kappa) \right] \right) & \text{if } \kappa \not\mid \eta \\
\end{cases}$$

Then:

$$\begin{align} a(n,k) &= \frac{1}{2(k-1)} \left(n^2 -(k-1)n + (k-2) + \phi(n+1,k-1) \right) \\&= \frac{1}{2(k-1)} \left((n-1)(n-(k-2)) + \phi(n+1,k-1) \right) \end{align}$$

As an example, if $(n,k) = (7,3)$, one expects $a(7,3) = 9$ arithmetic subsets and, counting directly, one sees that there are 9; these are $\{1,2,3\}, \{2,3,4\}, \{3,4,5\}, \{4,5,6\}, \{5,6,7\}, \{1,3,5\}, \{3,5,7\},\{2,4,6\}, \{1,4,7\}.$

== See also ==
- Arithmetic progression of squares
- Geometric progression
- Harmonic progression
- Triangular number
- Arithmetico-geometric sequence
- Inequality of arithmetic and geometric means
- Primes in arithmetic progression
- Linear difference equation
- Generalized arithmetic progression, a set of integers constructed as an arithmetic progression is, but allowing several possible differences
- Semilinear set, a higher-dimensional analogue of an arithmetic progression, built from a base vector and several period vectors, each used any number of times
- Heronian triangles with sides in arithmetic progression
- Problems involving arithmetic progressions
- Utonality
- Polynomials calculating sums of powers of arithmetic progressions
