= Matrix difference equation =

Relation of a matrix of variables between two points in time

In mathematics, a matrix difference equation is a difference equation in which the value of a vector (or sometimes, a matrix) of variables at one point in time is related to its own value at one or more previous points in time using matrices. The order of the equation is the maximum time gap between any two indicated values of the variable vector. For example,

$$\mathbf x_t = \mathbf{Ax}_{t-1} + \mathbf{Bx}_{t-2}$$

is an example of a second-order matrix difference equation, in which x is an n × 1 vector of variables and A and B are n × n matrices. This equation is homogeneous because there is no vector constant term added to the end of the equation. The same equation might also be written as

$$\mathbf x_{t+2} = \mathbf{Ax}_{t+1} + \mathbf{Bx}_{t}$$

or as

$$\mathbf x_n = \mathbf{Ax}_{n-1} + \mathbf{Bx}_{n-2}$$

The most commonly encountered matrix difference equations are first-order.

== Nonhomogeneous first-order case and the steady state ==
An example of a nonhomogeneous first-order matrix difference equation is

$$\mathbf x_t = \mathbf{Ax}_{t-1} + \mathbf{b}$$

with additive constant vector b ≠ 0. The steady state of this system is a value x* of the vector x which, if reached, would not be deviated from subsequently. x* is found by setting x_{t} = x_{t−1} = x* in the difference equation and solving for x* to obtain

$$\mathbf{x}^* = [\mathbf{I}-\mathbf{A}]^{-1}\mathbf{b}$$

where I is the n × n identity matrix, and where it is assumed that [I − A] is invertible. Then the nonhomogeneous equation can be rewritten in homogeneous form in terms of deviations from the steady state:

$$\left[\mathbf{x}_t - \mathbf{x}^*\right] = \mathbf{A}\left[\mathbf{x}_{t-1}-\mathbf{x}^*\right]$$

== Stability of the first-order case ==
The first-order matrix difference equation [x_{t} − x*] = A[x_{t−1} − x*] is stable—that is, x_{t} converges asymptotically to the steady state x*—if and only if all eigenvalues of the transition matrix A (whether real or complex) have an absolute value less than 1 (i.e., a spectral radius less than 1).

== Solution of the first-order case ==
Assume that the equation has been put in the homogeneous form y_{t} = Ay_{t−1}. Then we can iterate and substitute repeatedly from the initial condition y_{0}, which is the initial value of the vector y and which must be known in order to find the solution:

$$\begin{align}
\mathbf y_1 &= \mathbf{Ay}_0 \\
\mathbf y_2 &= \mathbf{Ay}_1=\mathbf A^2 \mathbf y_0 \\
\mathbf y_3 &= \mathbf{Ay}_2=\mathbf A^3 \mathbf y_0
\end{align}$$

and so forth, so that by induction the solution in terms of t is

$$\mathbf y_t=\mathbf A^t \mathbf y_0$$

Further, if A is diagonalizable, we can rewrite A in terms of its eigenvalues and eigenvectors, giving the solution as

$$\mathbf y_t = \mathbf{PD}^{t}\mathbf{P}^{-1} \mathbf y_0,$$

where P is an n × n matrix whose columns are the eigenvectors of A (assuming the eigenvalues are all distinct) and D is an n × n diagonal matrix whose diagonal elements are the eigenvalues of A. This solution motivates the above stability result: A^{t} shrinks to the zero matrix over time if and only if the eigenvalues of A are all less than 1 in absolute value.

== Extracting the dynamics of a single scalar variable from a first-order matrix system ==
Starting from the n-dimensional system y_{t} = Ay_{t−1}, we can extract the dynamics of one of the state variables, say y_{1}. The above solution equation for y_{t} shows that the solution for y_{1,t} is in terms of the n eigenvalues of A. Therefore the equation describing the evolution of y_{1} by itself must have a solution involving those same eigenvalues. This description intuitively motivates the equation of evolution of y_{1}, which is

$$y_{1,t} = a_1 y_{1,t-1} + a_2 y_{1,t-2} + \dots + a_n y_{1,t-n}$$

where the parameters a_{i} are from the characteristic equation of the matrix A:

$$\lambda^{n} - a_1 \lambda^{n-1} - a_2 \lambda^{n-2} - \dots - a_n \lambda^{0} = 0.$$

Thus each individual scalar variable of an n-dimensional first-order linear system evolves according to a univariate nth-degree difference equation, which has the same stability property (stable or unstable) as does the matrix difference equation.

== Solution and stability of higher-order cases ==
Matrix difference equations of higher order—that is, with a time lag longer than one period—can be solved, and their stability analyzed, by converting them into first-order form using a block matrix. For example, suppose we have the second-order equation

$$\mathbf x_t = \mathbf{Ax}_{t-1} + \mathbf{Bx}_{t-2}$$

with the variable vector x being n × 1 and A and B being n × n. This can be stacked in the form

$$\begin{bmatrix}\mathbf{x}_t \\ \mathbf{x}_{t-1} \\ \end{bmatrix} = \begin{bmatrix} \mathbf{A} & \mathbf{B} \\ \mathbf{I} & \mathbf{0} \\ \end{bmatrix} \begin{bmatrix} \mathbf{x}_{t-1} \\ \mathbf{x}_{t-2} \end{bmatrix}$$

where I is the n × n identity matrix and 0 is the n × n zero matrix. Then denoting the 2n × 1 stacked vector of current and once-lagged variables as z_{t} and the 2n × 2n block matrix as L, we have as before the solution

$$\mathbf z_t = \mathbf L^t \mathbf z_0$$

Also as before, this stacked equation, and thus the original second-order equation, are stable if and only if all eigenvalues of the matrix L are smaller than unity in absolute value.

== Nonlinear matrix difference equations: Riccati equations ==
In linear-quadratic-Gaussian control, there arises a nonlinear matrix equation for the reverse evolution of a current-and-future-cost matrix, denoted below as H. This equation is called a discrete dynamic Riccati equation, and it arises when a variable vector evolving according to a linear matrix difference equation is controlled by manipulating an exogenous vector in order to optimize a quadratic cost function. This Riccati equation assumes the following, or a similar, form:

$$\mathbf{H}_{t-1} = \mathbf{K} +\mathbf{A}'\mathbf{H}_t\mathbf{A} - \mathbf{A}'\mathbf{H}_t\mathbf{C}\left[\mathbf{C}'\mathbf{H}_t\mathbf{C}+\mathbf{R}\right]^{-1}\mathbf{C}'\mathbf{H}_t\mathbf{A}$$

where H, K, and A are n × n, C is n × k, R is k × k, n is the number of elements in the vector to be controlled, and k is the number of elements in the control vector. The parameter matrices A and C are from the linear equation, and the parameter matrices K and R are from the quadratic cost function. See here for details.

In general, this equation cannot be solved analytically for H_{t} in terms of t; rather, the sequence of values for H_{t} is found by iterating the Riccati equation. However, it has been shown that this Riccati equation can be solved analytically if R = 0 and n = k + 1, by reducing it to a scalar rational difference equation; moreover, for any k and n if the transition matrix A is nonsingular then the Riccati equation can be solved analytically in terms of the eigenvalues of a matrix, although these may need to be found numerically.

In most contexts, the evolution of H backwards through time is stable, meaning that H converges to a particular fixed matrix H* which may be irrational even if all the other matrices are rational. See also Stochastic control § Discrete time.

A related Riccati equation is

$$\mathbf{X}_{t+1} = -\left[\mathbf{E}+\mathbf{B}\mathbf{X}_t\right]\left[\mathbf{C}+\mathbf{A}\mathbf{X}_t\right]^{-1}$$

in which the matrices X, A, B, C, E are all n × n. This equation can be solved explicitly. Suppose $\mathbf X_t = \mathbf N_t \mathbf D_t^{-1},$ which certainly holds for t = 0 with N_{0} = X_{0} and with D_{0} = I. Then using this in the difference equation yields

$$\begin{align}
\mathbf{X}_{t+1}&=-\left[\mathbf{E}+\mathbf{BN}_t\mathbf{D}_t^{-1}\right]\mathbf{D}_t\mathbf{D}_t^{-1}\left[\mathbf{C}+\mathbf{AN}_t\mathbf{D}_t^{-1}\right]^{-1}\\
&=-\left[\mathbf{ED}_t+\mathbf{BN}_t\right]\left[\left[\mathbf{C}+\mathbf{AN}_t \mathbf{D}_t^{-1}\right]\mathbf{D}_t\right]^{-1}\\
&=-\left[\mathbf{ED}_t+\mathbf{BN}_t\right]\left[\mathbf{CD}_t+\mathbf{AN}_t\right]^{-1}\\
&=\mathbf{N}_{t+1}\mathbf{D}_{t+1}^{-1}
\end{align}$$

so by induction, the form $\mathbf X_t = \mathbf N_t \mathbf D_t^{-1}$ holds for all t. Then the evolution of N and D can be written as

$$\begin{bmatrix} \mathbf{N}_{t+1} \\ \mathbf{D}_{t+1} \end{bmatrix} = \begin{bmatrix} -\mathbf{B} & -\mathbf{E} \\ \mathbf{A} & \mathbf{C} \end{bmatrix} \begin{bmatrix} \mathbf{N}_t \\ \mathbf{D}_t \end{bmatrix} \equiv \mathbf{J} \begin{bmatrix}\mathbf{N}_t \\ \mathbf{D}_t \end{bmatrix}$$

Thus by induction

$$\begin{bmatrix} \mathbf{N}_t \\ \mathbf{D}_t \end{bmatrix} = \mathbf{J}^{t} \begin{bmatrix} \mathbf{N}_0 \\ \mathbf{D}_0 \end{bmatrix}$$

== See also ==
- Matrix differential equation
- Difference equation
- Linear difference equation
- Dynamical system
- Algebraic Riccati equation
