= Geometric progression =

Mathematical sequence of numbers

Diagram illustrating three basic geometric sequences of the pattern 1(r^{n−1}) up to 6 iterations deep. The first block is a unit block and the dashed line represents the infinite sum of the sequence, a number that it will forever approach but never touch: 2, 3/2, and 4/3 respectively.

A geometric progression, also known as a geometric sequence, is a mathematical sequence of non-zero numbers where each term after the first is found by multiplying the previous one by a fixed number called the common ratio. For example, the sequence 2, 6, 18, 54, ... is a geometric progression with a common ratio of 3. Similarly 10, 5, 2.5, 1.25, ... is a geometric sequence with a common ratio of 1/2.

Examples of a geometric sequence are powers r^{k} of a fixed non-zero number r, such as 2^{k} and 3^{k}. The general form of a geometric sequence is
$$a,\ ar,\ ar^2,\ ar^3,\ ar^4,\ \ldots$$
where r is the common ratio and a is the initial value.

The sum of a geometric progression's terms is called a geometric series. Because each two successive numbers in the progression have the same proportion, the terms in a geometric series are also said to be in continued proportion, especially in the context of ancient Greek mathematics, where geometric progressions were described in this way rather than through powers of the common ratio.

== Properties ==
The nth term of a geometric sequence with initial value a = a_{1} and common ratio r is given by
$$a_n = a\,r^{n-1},$$
and in general
$$a_n = a_m\,r^{n-m}.$$
Geometric sequences satisfy the linear recurrence relation
$$a_n = r\,a_{n-1}$$
for every integer $n > 1.$ This is a first-order, homogeneous linear recurrence with constant coefficients.

Geometric sequences also satisfy the nonlinear recurrence relation
$$a_{n} = a_{n-1}^2 / a_{n-2}$$
for every integer $n > 2$. This is a second-order nonlinear recurrence with constant coefficients.

When the common ratio of a geometric sequence is positive, the sequence's terms will all share the sign of the first term. When the common ratio of a geometric sequence is negative, the sequence's terms alternate between positive and negative; this is called an alternating sequence. For instance, the sequence 1, −3, 9, −27, 81, −243, ... is an alternating geometric sequence with an initial value of 1 and a common ratio of −3. When the initial term and common ratio are complex numbers, the terms' complex arguments follow an arithmetic progression.

If the absolute value of the common ratio is smaller than 1, the terms will decrease in magnitude and approach zero via an exponential decay. If the absolute value of the common ratio is greater than 1, the terms will increase in magnitude and approach infinity via an exponential growth. If the absolute value of the common ratio equals 1, the terms will stay the same size indefinitely, though their signs or complex arguments may change.

Geometric progressions show exponential growth or exponential decline, as opposed to arithmetic progressions showing linear growth or linear decline. This comparison was taken by T.R. Malthus as the mathematical foundation of his An Essay on the Principle of Population. The two kinds of progression are related through the exponential function and the logarithm: exponentiating each term of an arithmetic progression yields a geometric progression, while taking the logarithm of each term in a geometric progression yields an arithmetic progression. The relation that the logarithm provides between a geometric progression in its argument and an arithmetic progression of values, prompted A. A. de Sarasa to make the connection of Saint-Vincent's quadrature and the tradition of logarithms in prosthaphaeresis, leading to the term "hyperbolic logarithm", a synonym for natural logarithm.

== Geometric series ==
An illustration of an infinite geometric series $\frac{1}{4} + \frac{1}{16} + \frac{1}{64} + \frac{1}{256} + \cdots$. It is convergent.

A geometric series is a series derived from the terms $a, ar, ar^2, \dots, ar^k, \dots$. The geometric series can be either finite or infinite. The infinite geometric series sums the infinitely many terms of a geometric progression. The calculation can either have a result (convergence) or otherwise (divergence). An infinite geometric series is convergent if the absolute value of a common ratio is less than one $|r| < 1$, showing that the terms approach zero and the partial sums become smaller in magnitude, Likewise, an infinite geometric series is divergent if the absolute value of a common ratio is greater than one $|r| > 1$, indicating the terms and the partial sums become bigger in magnitude. An infinite geometric series when $|r| = 1$ shows its terms become no larger or smaller in magnitude, and the sequence of partial sums of the series does not converge.

== Product ==
The infinite product of a geometric progression is the product of all of its terms. The partial product of a geometric progression up to the term with power $n$ is

$$\prod_{k=0}^{n} ar^{(k)} = a^{n + 1} r^{n(n+1)/2}.$$

When $a$ and $r$ are positive real numbers, this is equivalent to taking the geometric mean of the partial progression's first and last individual terms and then raising that mean to the power given by the number of terms $n + 1.$

$$\prod_{k=0}^{n} ar^k = a^{n+1} r^{n(n+1)/2} = (\sqrt{a^{2}r^n})^{n+1} \text{ for } a \geq 0, r \geq 0.$$

This corresponds to a similar property of sums of terms of a finite arithmetic sequence: the sum of an arithmetic sequence is the number of terms times the arithmetic mean of the first and last individual terms. This correspondence follows the usual pattern that any arithmetic sequence is a sequence of logarithms of terms of a geometric sequence and any geometric sequence is a sequence of exponentiations of terms of an arithmetic sequence. Sums of logarithms correspond to products of exponentiated values.

=== Proof ===
Let $P_n$ represent the product up to power $n$. Written out in full,

$$P_n = a \cdot ar \cdot ar^2 \cdots ar^{n-1} \cdot ar^n$$.

Carrying out the multiplications and gathering like terms,

$$P_n = a^{n+1} r^{1+2+3+ \cdots +(n-1)+n}$$.

The exponent of r is the sum of an arithmetic sequence. Substituting the formula for that sum,

$$P_n = a^{n+1} r^\frac{n(n+1)}{2}$$,

which concludes the proof.

One can rearrange this expression to

$$P_n = (ar^\frac{n}{2})^{n+1}.$$

Rewriting a as $\textstyle \sqrt{a^2}$ and r as $\textstyle \sqrt{r^2}$ though this is not valid for $a < 0$ or $r < 0,$

$$P_n = (\sqrt{a^{2}r^n})^{n+1} \text{ for } a \geq 0, r \geq 0$$

which is the formula in terms of the geometric mean.

== History ==
A clay tablet from the Early Dynastic Period in Mesopotamia (c. 2900 – c. 2350 BC), identified as MS 3047, contains a geometric progression with base 3 and multiplier 1/2. It has been suggested to be Sumerian, from the city of Shuruppak. It is the only known record of a geometric progression from before the time of old Babylonian mathematics beginning in 2000 BC.

Books VIII and IX of Euclid's Elements analyze geometric progressions (such as the powers of two, see the article for details) and give several of their properties.

== See also ==
- Arithmetic progression – Sequence of equally spaced numbers
- Arithmetico-geometric sequence – Mathematical sequence satisfying a specific pattern
- Linear difference equation – Mathematical relation defining a sequence
- Exponential function – Mathematical function, denoted exp(x) or e^x
- Harmonic progression – Progression formed by taking the reciprocals of an arithmetic progression
- Harmonic series – Divergent sum of positive unit fractions
- Infinite series – Infinite sum
- Preferred number – Selection constraint in industrial design
- Thomas Robert Malthus – English Christian priest and political economist (1766–1834)
- Geometric distribution – Probability distribution
