= Aphasia (disambiguation) =

Aphasia is the inability to comprehend or formulate language.

Aphasia may also refer to:

- Aphasia (Japanese band), a female heavy metal/hard rock band from Japan
- Jargon aphasia, a type of aphasia involving noun selection difficulty
- On Aphasia, an 1891 book by Sigmund Freud
- Aphasia (film), a Canadian animated short film
- Aphasia (album), 2015 studio album by Tanya Chua
- "Aphasia", a track on the album Wings of Tomorrow by the Swedish rock band Europe
- "Aphasia", a track on the album Cardinal by the American folk rock band Pinegrove
- Aphasia, the noise project of former musician and Al-Qaeda member Adam Yahiye Gadahn

== See also ==
- Category:Aphasias
