= Initial condition =

Parameter in differential equations and dynamical systems

In mathematics and particularly in dynamical systems, an initial condition is the initial value (often at time $t=0$) of a differential equation, difference equation, or other "time"-dependent equation which evolves in time. The most fundamental case, an ordinary differential equation of order k (the number of derivatives in the equation), generally requires k initial conditions to trace the equation's evolution through time. In other contexts, the term may refer to an initial value of a recurrence relation, discrete dynamical system, hyperbolic partial differential equation, or even a seed value of a pseudorandom number generator, at "time zero", enough such that the overall system can be evolved in "time", which may be discrete or continuous. The problem of determining a system's evolution from initial conditions is referred to as an initial value problem.

== Linear system ==
=== Discrete time ===
A linear matrix difference equation of the homogeneous (having no constant term) form $X_{t+1}=AX_t$ has closed form solution $X_t=A^tX_0$ predicated on the vector $X_0$ of initial conditions on the individual variables that are stacked into the vector; $X_0$ is called the vector of initial conditions or simply the initial condition, and contains nk pieces of information, n being the dimension of the vector X and k = 1 being the number of time lags in the system. The initial conditions in this linear system do not affect the qualitative nature of the future behavior of the state variable X; that behavior is stable or unstable based on the eigenvalues of the matrix A but not based on the initial conditions.

Alternatively, a dynamic process in a single variable x having multiple time lags is

$$x_t=a_1x_{t-1} +a_2x_{t-2}+\cdots +a_kx_{t-k}.$$

Here the dimension is n = 1 and the order is k, so the necessary number of initial conditions to trace the system through time, either iteratively or via closed form solution, is nk = k. Again the initial conditions do not affect the qualitative nature of the variable's long-term evolution. The solution of this equation is found by using its characteristic equation $\lambda^k-a_1\lambda^{k-1} -a_2\lambda^{k-2}-\cdots -a_{k-1}\lambda-a_k=0$ to obtain the latter's k solutions, which are the characteristic values $\lambda_1, \dots , \lambda_k,$ for use in the solution equation

$$x_t=c_1\lambda _1^t+\cdots + c_k\lambda _k^t.$$

Here the constants $c_1, \dots , c_k$ are found by solving a system of k different equations based on this equation, each using one of k different values of t for which the specific initial condition $x_t$ Is known.

=== Continuous time ===
A differential equation system of the first order with n variables stacked in a vector X is

$$\frac{dX}{dt}=AX.$$

Its behavior through time can be traced with a closed form solution conditional on an initial condition vector $X_0$. The number of required initial pieces of information is the dimension n of the system times the order k = 1 of the system, or n. The initial conditions do not affect the qualitative behavior (stable or unstable) of the system.

A single k^{th} order linear equation in a single variable x is

$$\frac{d^{k}x}{dt^k}+a_{k-1}\frac{d^{k-1}x}{dt^{k-1}}+\cdots +a_1\frac{dx}{dt} +a_0x=0.$$

Here the number of initial conditions necessary for obtaining a closed form solution is the dimension n = 1 times the order k, or simply k. In this case the k initial pieces of information will typically not be different values of the variable x at different points in time, but rather the values of x and its first k – 1 derivatives, all at some point in time such as time zero. The initial conditions do not affect the qualitative nature of the system's behavior. The characteristic equation of this dynamic equation is $\lambda^k+a_{k-1}\lambda^{k-1}+\cdots +a_1\lambda +a_0=0,$ whose solutions are the characteristic values $\lambda_1,\dots , \lambda_k;$ these are used in the solution equation

$$x(t)=c_1e^{\lambda_1t}+\cdots + c_ke^{\lambda_kt}.$$

This equation and its first k – 1 derivatives form a system of k equations that can be solved for the k parameters $c_1, \dots , c_k,$ given the known initial conditions on x and its k – 1 derivatives' values at some time t.

== Nonlinear systems ==
Nonlinear systems can exhibit a substantially richer variety of behavior than linear systems can. In particular, the initial conditions can affect whether the system diverges to infinity or whether it gets trapped near one or another attractor of the system. Each attractor, a (possibly disconnected) region of values that some dynamic paths approach but never leave, has a (possibly disconnected) basin of attraction such that state variables with initial conditions in that basin (and nowhere else) will evolve toward that attractor. Even nearby initial conditions could be in basins of attraction of different attractors (see for example Newton's method#Basins of attraction).

Moreover, in those nonlinear systems showing chaotic behavior, the evolution of the variables exhibits sensitive dependence on initial conditions: the iterated values of any two very nearby points on the same strange attractor, while each remaining on the attractor, will diverge from each other over time. Thus even on a single attractor the precise values of the initial conditions make a substantial difference for the future positions of the iterates. This feature makes accurate simulation of future values difficult, and impossible over long horizons, because stating the initial conditions with exact precision is seldom possible and because rounding error is inevitable after even only a few iterations from an exact initial condition.

== Empirical laws and initial conditions ==
Every empirical law has the disquieting quality that one does not know its limitations. We have seen that there are regularities in the events in the world around us which can be formulated in terms of mathematical concepts with an uncanny accuracy. There are, on the other hand, aspects of the world concerning which we do not believe in the existence of any accurate regularities. We call these initial conditions.

== See also ==
- Boundary condition
- Initialization vector, in cryptography
