= Generalizations of Fibonacci numbers =

Mathematical sequences

In mathematics, the Fibonacci numbers form a sequence defined recursively by:

$$F_n =
\begin{cases}
0 & n = 0 \\
1 & n = 1 \\
F_{n - 1} + F_{n - 2} & n > 1
\end{cases}$$

That is, after two starting values, each number is the sum of the two preceding numbers.

The Fibonacci sequence has been studied extensively and generalized in many ways, for example, by starting with other numbers than 0 and 1, by adding more than two numbers to generate the next number, or by adding objects other than numbers.

== Extension to negative integers ==
Using $F_{n-2} = F_n - F_{n-1}$, one can extend the Fibonacci numbers to negative integers. So we get:

... −8, 5, −3, 2, −1, 1, 0, 1, 1, 2, 3, 5, 8, ...

and $F_{-n} = (-1)^{n + 1} F_n$.

See also Negafibonacci coding.

== Extension to all real or complex numbers ==
There are a number of possible generalizations of the Fibonacci numbers which include the real numbers (and sometimes the complex numbers) in their domain. These each involve the golden ratio φ, and are based on Binet's formula

$F_n = \frac{\varphi^n - (-\varphi)^{-n}}{\sqrt{5}}$.

The analytic function

$$\operatorname{Fe}(x) = \frac{\varphi^x - \varphi^{-x}}{\sqrt{5}}$$

has the property that $\operatorname{Fe}(n) = F_n$ for even integers $n$. Similarly, the analytic function:

$$\operatorname{Fo}(x) = \frac{\varphi^x + \varphi^{-x}}{\sqrt{5}}$$

satisfies $\operatorname{Fo}(n) = F_n$ for odd integers $n$.

Finally, putting these together, the analytic function

$$\operatorname{Fib}(x) = \frac{\varphi^x - \cos(x \pi)\varphi^{-x}}{\sqrt{5}}$$

satisfies $\operatorname{Fib}(n) = F_n$ for all integers $n$.

Since $\operatorname{Fib}(z + 2) = \operatorname{Fib}(z + 1) + \operatorname{Fib}(z)$ for all complex numbers $z$, this function also provides an extension of the Fibonacci sequence to the entire complex plane. Hence we can calculate the generalized Fibonacci function of a complex variable, for example,

$$\operatorname{Fib}(3+4i) \approx -5248.5 - 14195.9 i$$

However, this extension is by no means unique. For example, either

$\operatorname{Fib}(x) = \frac{\varphi^x - \cos(k x \pi)\varphi^{-x}}{\sqrt{5}}$ or
$$\operatorname{Fib}(x) = \frac{\varphi^x - \exp(ik x \pi)\varphi^{-x}}{\sqrt{5}}$$

for any odd integer k is an extension of the Fibonacci number sequence to the entire complex plane, as is any linear combination of them for which the coefficients sum to 1.

== Vector space ==
The term Fibonacci sequence is also applied more generally to any function $g$ from the integers to a field for which $g(n) = g(n - 1) + g(n - 2)$. These functions are precisely those of the form ${{{1}}}$, so the Fibonacci sequences form a vector space with the functions $F(n)$ and $F(n - 1)$ as a basis.

More generally, the range of $g$ may be taken to be any abelian group (regarded as a Z-module). Then the Fibonacci sequences form a 2-dimensional Z-module in the same way.

== Similar integer sequences ==
=== Fibonacci integer sequences ===
The 2-dimensional $\mathbb{Z}$-module of Fibonacci integer sequences consists of all integer sequences satisfying $g(n) = g(n - 1) + g(n - 2)$. Expressed in terms of two initial values we have:

$$g(n) = F(n)g(1) + F(n-1)g(0) = g(1)\frac{\varphi^n-(-\varphi)^{-n}}{\sqrt 5}+g(0)\frac{\varphi^{n-1}-(-\varphi)^{1-n}}{\sqrt 5},$$

where $\varphi$ is the golden ratio.

The ratio between two consecutive elements converges to the golden ratio, except in the case of the sequence which is constantly zero and the sequences where the ratio of the two first terms is $(-\varphi)^{-1}$.

The sequence can be written in the form

$$a\varphi^n+b(-\varphi)^{-n},$$

in which $a = 0$ if and only if $b = 0$. In this form the simplest non-trivial example has $a = b = 1$, which is the sequence of Lucas numbers:

$L_n = \varphi^n + (-\varphi)^{- n}$.

We have $L_1 = 1$ and $L_2 = 3$. The properties include:

$$\begin{align}
\varphi^n &= \left(\frac{1+\sqrt{5}}{2}\right)^{\!n} = \frac{L(n)+F(n)\sqrt{5}}{2}, \\
L(n) &= F(n-1) + F(n+1).
\end{align}$$

Every nontrivial Fibonacci integer sequence appears (possibly after a shift by a finite number of positions) as one of the rows of the Wythoff array. The Fibonacci sequence itself is the first row, and a shift of the Lucas sequence is the second row.

See also Fibonacci integer sequences modulo n.

=== Lucas sequences ===
A different generalization of the Fibonacci sequence is the Lucas sequences of the kind defined as follows:

$$\begin{align}
U(0) &= 0 \\
U(1) &= 1 \\
U(n + 2) &= P U(n + 1) - Q U(n),
\end{align}$$

where the normal Fibonacci sequence is the special case of $P = 1$ and $Q = -1$. Another kind of Lucas sequence begins with $V(0) = 2$, $V(1) = P$. Such sequences have applications in number theory and primality proving.

When $Q = -1$, this sequence is called P-Fibonacci sequence, for example, Pell sequence is also called 2-Fibonacci sequence.

The 3-Fibonacci sequence is

0, 1, 3, 10, 33, 109, 360, 1189, 3927, 12970, 42837, 141481, 467280, 1543321, 5097243, 16835050, 55602393, 183642229, 606529080, ... (sequence A006190 in the OEIS)

The 4-Fibonacci sequence is

0, 1, 4, 17, 72, 305, 1292, 5473, 23184, 98209, 416020, 1762289, 7465176, 31622993, 133957148, 567451585, 2403763488, ... (sequence A001076 in the OEIS)

The 5-Fibonacci sequence is

0, 1, 5, 26, 135, 701, 3640, 18901, 98145, 509626, 2646275, 13741001, 71351280, 370497401, 1923838285, 9989688826, ... (sequence A052918 in the OEIS)

The 6-Fibonacci sequence is

0, 1, 6, 37, 228, 1405, 8658, 53353, 328776, 2026009, 12484830, 76934989, 474094764, 2921503573, 18003116202, ... (sequence A005668 in the OEIS)

The k-Fibonacci constant is the ratio toward which adjacent $k$-Fibonacci numbers tend; it is also called the kth metallic mean, and it is the only positive root of $x^2 - kx - 1 = 0$. For example, the case of $k = 1$ is $\frac{1 + \sqrt{5}}{2}$, or the golden ratio, and the case of $k = 2$ is $1 + \sqrt{2}$, or the silver ratio. Generally, the case of $k$ is $\frac{k + \sqrt{k^2 + 4}}{2}$.

Generally, $U(n)$ can be called (P,−Q)-Fibonacci sequence, and V(n) can be called (P,−Q)-Lucas sequence.

The (1,2)-Fibonacci sequence is

0, 1, 1, 3, 5, 11, 21, 43, 85, 171, 341, 683, 1365, 2731, 5461, 10923, 21845, 43691, 87381, 174763, 349525, 699051, 1398101, 2796203, 5592405, 11184811, 22369621, 44739243, 89478485, ... (sequence A001045 in the OEIS)

The (1,3)-Fibonacci sequence is

1, 1, 4, 7, 19, 40, 97, 217, 508, 1159, 2683, 6160, 14209, 32689, 75316, 173383, 399331, 919480, 2117473, 4875913, 11228332, 25856071, 59541067, ... (sequence A006130 in the OEIS)

The (2,2)-Fibonacci sequence is

0, 1, 2, 6, 16, 44, 120, 328, 896, 2448, 6688, 18272, 49920, 136384, 372608, 1017984, 2781184, 7598336, 20759040, 56714752, ... (sequence A002605 in the OEIS)

The (3,3)-Fibonacci sequence is

0, 1, 3, 12, 45, 171, 648, 2457, 9315, 35316, 133893, 507627, 1924560, 7296561, 27663363, 104879772, 397629405, 1507527531, 5715470808, ... (sequence A030195 in the OEIS)

=== Fibonacci numbers of higher order ===
A Fibonacci sequence of order k, also termed k-nacci sequence, is an integer sequence in which each sequence element is the sum of the previous $k$ elements (with the exception of the first $k$ elements in the sequence). The usual Fibonacci numbers are a Fibonacci sequence of order 2. The number of compositions of nonnegative integers into parts that are at most $k$ is a Fibonacci sequence of order $k$. The sequence of the number of strings of 0s and 1s of length $m$ that contain at most $k$ consecutive 0s is also a Fibonacci sequence of order $k$.

These sequences, their limiting ratios, and the limit of these limiting ratios, were investigated by Mark Barr in 1913.

==== Tribonacci numbers ====
A variation of the Fibonacci number sequence is the tribonacci number sequence, where each number is the sum of the three preceding numbers. Starting with the initial values $T_0=T_1=0$, and $T_2=1$, the recurrence
$$T_{n} = T_{n-1} + T_{n-2} + T_{n-3}, \qquad\qquad (1)$$
gives this sequence of numbers as
$$0, 0, 1, 1, 2, 4, 7, 13, 24, 44, 81, 149, 274, 504, 927, 1705, 3136, 5768, 10609, 19513, 35890, 66012, \ldots.$$
Further terms can be found under sequence number A000073 in The On-Line Encyclopedia of Integer Sequences (OEIS).

The tribonacci sequence has a long and interesting history. The most notable historical occurrence of the sequence is connected to Charles Darwin (1809–1882) and his seminal book On the Origin of Species, where the procreation and population growth of elephants is considered as an illustrative example. In 1892, the sequence of numbers appeared in the solution of a recreational problem, concerning a farmer and the raising of sheep, that was posed by the American mathematician Artemas Martin (1835–1918). The first mathematical treatment of the tribonacci sequence and an investigation of its properties was done in 1914 and is due to Agronomof. The moniker tribonacci appeared much later, not until 1963, and is due to Mark Feinberg, at the time a fourteen-year-old high-school student, who introduced the term in an article in the Fibonacci Quarterly.

Agronomof's identity. Agronomof's 1914 note is a small gem that was ignored, made no impact at the time, and gathered dust for over half a century. Although a very brief note (the modern day replica easily fits on a single page), it contains the powerful identity
$$T_{n+k} = T_{k+1}T_{n+1} + \left(T_k+T_{k-1}\right)T_{n} + T_kT_{n-1}. \qquad\qquad (2)$$
Note that Agronomof's identity is symmetric in $n$ and $k$, and that, for $k=2$, one recovers the original tribonacci recurrence. Agronomof made his derivation under the assumption that both parameters $n$ and $k$ are nonnegative integers. However, one can show that the identity is more general and actually holds for arbitrary integers $n$ and $k$ by extending the defining recurrence (1) to include tribonacci numbers with negative indices. Agronomof ends his note by showcasing the following propriétés remarquables of the tribonacci numbers,
$$T_{2n} = T_{n+1}^2 + 2T_nT_{n-1} + T_{n}^2 \quad\mathrm{and}\quad
T_{2n-1} = T_{n-1}^2 + 2T_nT_{n+1} - T_n^2. \qquad\qquad (3)$$
These are easily derived from his identity by taking $k=n$ and $k=n-1$. In turn, these two identities can be leveraged to derive a simple expression for the sum of squares of the tribonacci numbers.

Reflection formula. As with the Fibonacci numbers, one can run the recurrence for the tribonacci numbers backwards. From $T_2, T_1$, and $T_0$, one can determine $T_{-1}=1$. From $T_1, T_0$, and $T_{-1}$, one can determine $T_{-2}=-1$, and so on. Thus, the values for the tribonacci numbers at negative indices are well defined. Starting with $T_{0}=0$, $T_{-1}=1$, and $T_{-2}=-1$, and reversing the tribonacci recurrence (1), gives the sequence of negatively indexed tribonacci numbers as
$$0, 1, -1, 0, 2, -3, 1, 4, -8, 5, 7, -20, 18, 9, -47, 56, 0, -103, 159, -56, -206, 421, -271, -356, 1048, \ldots.$$
Further terms can be found under sequence number A057597 in The On-Line Encyclopedia of Integer Sequences (OEIS). The extension to negative indices means that one can view the tribonacci sequence as a double infinite sequence:
$$\ldots, -47, 9, 18,-20, 7, 5,-8, 4, 1,-3, 2, 0,-1, 1, \mathbf0, 0, 1, 1, 2, 4, 7, 13, 24, 44, 81, 149, 274, 504, 927, \ldots$$
where the value at index zero is given in bold. Traversing the sequence from left to right, one uses recurrence (1). Traversing the sequence from right to left, one uses the recurrence $T_n = T_{n+3} - T_{n+2} - T_{n+1}$. The relationship between the negative and positive indexed segments of the tribonacci sequence is given by
$$T_{-n} = T_{n+1}^2 - T_{n}T_{n+2}. \qquad\qquad (4)$$
This identity holds for all integers $n$, and is known as the reflection formula for the tribonacci numbers. It can be derived using Agronomof's identity.

The tribonacci constant
$$\begin{align}
\tau &=\frac{1 +\sqrt[3]{19 +3\sqrt{33}} +\sqrt[3]{19 -3\sqrt{33}}}{3} \\
&=\frac{1 +4\cosh \left( \frac{1}{3}\cosh^{-1} \left( \frac{19}{8} \right) \right)}{3}
\end{align}$$
is the ratio toward which adjacent tribonacci numbers tend. It is the unique real root $x =\tau$ of the polynomial $x^3 -x^2-x-1=0$, approximately 1.839286755214161... (sequence A058265 in the OEIS), and also satisfies the equation $x +x^{-3} =2$. It is important in the study of the snub cube.

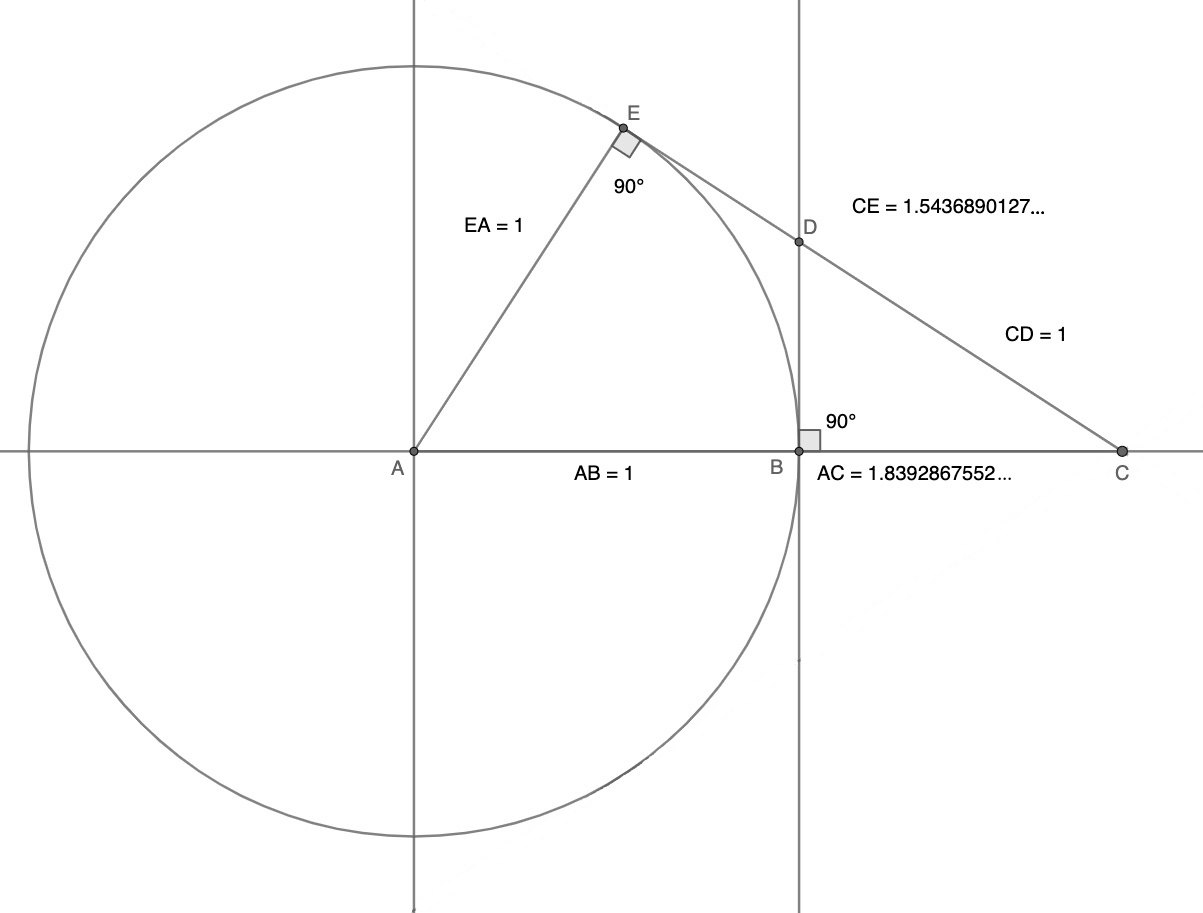
Construction of the tribonacci constant with compass and marked ruler as described by Xerardo Neira. BC = τ − 1 and BD = 1/τ.

The reciprocal of the tribonacci constant is the single real root $x =\tfrac{1}{\tau}$ of $x^3 +x^2+x-1=0$, and can be written as
$$\frac{1}{\tau} =\frac{-1 +\sqrt[3]{17 +3\sqrt{33}} +\sqrt[3]{17 -3\sqrt{33}}}{3}\,,$$
approximately 0.543689012692076... (sequence A192918 in the OEIS).

The tribonacci numbers are also given by
$$T_{n+1} =\left\lfloor 3b\, \frac{ \left( \frac{1}{3} \left( a_{+} +a_{-} +1 \right) \right)^n}{b^2 -2b+4} \right\rceil$$

where $\lfloor \cdot \rceil$ denotes the nearest integer function and
$$\begin{align}
a_{\pm} &= \sqrt[3]{19 \pm 3 \sqrt{33}}\,, \\
b &= \sqrt[3]{586 + 102 \sqrt{33}}\,.
\end{align}$$

Corresponding to the Lucas numbers for the Fibonacci sequence, if one instead starts with $L_0 =3, L_1 =1 \text{ and } L_2 =3$ and applies the tribonacci recursion then $L_n =\lfloor \tau^n \rceil$ for $n \ge 4$ (sequence A001644 in the OEIS)

==== Tetranacci numbers ====
The tetranacci numbers start with four predetermined terms, each term afterwards being the sum of the preceding four terms. The first few tetranacci numbers are:

0, 0, 0, 1, 1, 2, 4, 8, 15, 29, 56, 108, 208, 401, 773, 1490, 2872, 5536, 10671, 20569, 39648, 76424, 147312, 283953, 547337, … (sequence A000078 in the OEIS)

Feinberg also coined the term tetranacci.

The tetranacci constant is the ratio toward which adjacent tetranacci numbers tend. It is the unique positive real root of the polynomial $x^4 - x^3 - x^2 - x - 1 = 0$, approximately 1.927561975482925... (sequence A086088 in the OEIS), and also satisfies the equation $x + x^{-4} = 2$.

The tetranacci constant can be expressed in terms of radicals by the following expression:

$$x = \frac{1}{4}\!\left(1+\sqrt{u}+\sqrt{11-u+\frac{26}{\sqrt{u}}}\,\right)$$

where,

$$u = \frac{1}{3}\left(11-56\sqrt[3]{\frac{2}{-65+3\sqrt{1689}}}+2\cdot2^{\frac{2}{3}}\sqrt[3]{-65+3\sqrt{1689}}\right)$$

and $u$ is the real root of the cubic equation $u^3-11u^2+115u-169$.

Corresponding to the Lucas numbers for the Fibonacci sequence, if one instead starts with $L_0 = 4$, $L_1 = 1$, $L_2 = 3$, and $L_3 = 7$ and applies the tetranacci recursion then $L_n = \lfloor x^n \rceil$ for $n \ge 6$ (sequence A073817 in the OEIS)

==== Pentanacci numbers ====
0, 0, 0, 0, 1, 1, 2, 4, 8, 16, 31, 61, 120, 236, 464, 912, 1793, 3525, 6930, 13624, … (sequence A001591 in the OEIS)

The pentanacci constant is the ratio toward which adjacent pentanacci numbers tend. It is the unique real root of the polynomial $x^5 - x^4 - x^3 - x^2 - x - 1 = 0$, approximately 1.965948236645485... (sequence A103814 in the OEIS), and also satisfies the equation $x + x^{-5} = 2$.

==== Hexanacci numbers ====
0, 0, 0, 0, 0, 1, 1, 2, 4, 8, 16, 32, 63, 125, 248, 492, 976, 1936, 3840, 7617, 15109, … (sequence A001592 in the OEIS)

The hexanacci constant is the ratio toward which adjacent hexanacci numbers tend. It is the unique positive real root of the polynomial $x^6 - x^5 - x^4 - x^3 - x^2 - x - 1 = 0$, approximately 1.983582843424326... (sequence A118427 in the OEIS), and also satisfies the equation $x + x^{-6} = 2$.

==== Heptanacci numbers ====
0, 0, 0, 0, 0, 0, 1, 1, 2, 4, 8, 16, 32, 64, 127, 253, 504, 1004, 2000, 3984, 7936, 15808, … (sequence A122189 in the OEIS)

The heptanacci constant is the ratio toward which adjacent heptanacci numbers tend. It is the unique real root of the polynomial $x^7 - x^6 - x^5 - x^4 - x^3 - x^2 - x - 1 = 0$, approximately 1.991964196605035... (sequence A118428 in the OEIS), and also satisfies the equation $x + x^{-7} = 2$.

==== Octanacci numbers ====
0, 0, 0, 0, 0, 0, 0, 1, 1, 2, 4, 8, 16, 32, 64, 128, 255, 509, 1016, 2028, 4048, 8080, 16128, ... (sequence A079262 in the OEIS)

==== Enneanacci numbers ====
0, 0, 0, 0, 0, 0, 0, 0, 1, 1, 2, 4, 8, 16, 32, 64, 128, 256, 511, 1021, 2040, 4076, 8144, 16272, ... (sequence A104144 in the OEIS)

==== Infinacci numbers ====
An "infinacci" sequence, if one could be described, would, after an infinite number of zeroes, yield the sequence

[..., 0, 0, 1,] 1, 2, 4, 8, 16, 32, …

which are simply the powers of two.

==== k-nacci numbers ====
The nth k-nacci number $F_n^{(k)}$ is the coefficient of $x^n$ in the expansion of the ordinary generating function $f_k(x)={x^{k-1}\over1-\sum_{j=1}^kx^j}={x^{k-1}(1-x)\over1-2x+x^{k+1}}$ about the point $x=0$.

The limit of the ratio of successive terms of the $k$-nacci series is the root nearest to 2 of the characteristic equation $r^k - \sum_{i = 0}^{k-1} r^i = 0$, which (multiplying both sides by $1-r$) can be expressed as $r + r^{-k} = 2$ (OEIS: A103814, OEIS: A118427, OEIS: A118428).

The special case $k = 2$ is the traditional Fibonacci series yielding the golden section $\varphi = 1 + \frac{1}{\varphi}$.

The above formulas for the ratio hold even for $k$-nacci series generated from arbitrary starting numbers. The ratio approaches 2 in the limit that $k$ increases to infinity.

Let $x=r^{-1}$ be the position of the closest pole of $f_k(x)$. Since the denominator $1-\sum_{j=1}^kx^j$ is concave along the positive reals while the convolved version $1-2x+x^{k+1}$ is convex, using an iteration of Newton's method from the approximation of the root $x\approx\frac12$ gives an upper bound with the former polynomial and a lower bound with the latter; $1+\frac1{2^{k+1}-k-1}<\frac x2<1+\frac1{2^{k+1}-k-2}$, translating to the tight bounds $2-\frac1{2^k-\frac{k+1}2}<r<2-\frac1{2^k-\frac k2}$.

The negative root of the characteristic equation is in the interval $(-1, 0)$ when $k$ is even. This root and each complex root of the characteristic equation has modulus $3^{-k} < |r| < 1$.

A series for the positive root $r$ for any $k > 0$ is

$2 - 2\sum_{i > 0} \frac{1}{i}\binom{(k+1)i -2}{i-1}\frac{1}{2^{(k+1)i}}$.

There is no solution of the characteristic equation in terms of radicals when 5 ≤ k ≤ 11.

The n-th element of the k-nacci sequence is given by

$$F_n^{(k)} = \left\lfloor \frac{r^{n-1}(r-1)}{(k+1)r-2k}\right\rceil\!,$$

where $\lfloor \cdot \rceil$ denotes the nearest integer function.

Corresponding to the Lucas numbers for the Fibonacci sequence, if one instead starts with $L_0 = k$ and $L_n = 2^n-1$ for $0 < n < k$, and applies the $k$-nacci recursion to compute $L_n$ for $n \ge k$ then $L_n = \lfloor r^n \rceil$ for all large enough values of $n$, where $r$ is the $k$-nacci constant. Equivalently, one could start with $L_0 = k$ and $L_n = -1$ for $-k < n < 0$, and then apply the $k$-nacci recursion to compute $L_n$ for $n > 0$.

A coin-tossing problem is related to the $k$-nacci sequence. The probability that no $k$ consecutive tails will occur in $m$ tosses of an idealized coin is $\frac{1}{2^m}F^{(k)}_{m + 2}$. (See Feller's coin-tossing constants.)

== Fibonacci word ==
In analogy to its numerical counterpart, the Fibonacci word is defined by:

$$F_n := F(n):= \begin{cases}
\text{b}      & n = 0; \\
\text{a}      & n = 1; \\
F(n-1)+F(n-2) & n > 1. \\
\end{cases}$$

where $+$ denotes the concatenation of two strings. The sequence of Fibonacci strings starts:

b, a, ab, aba, abaab, abaababa, abaababaabaab, … (sequence A106750 in the OEIS)

The length of each Fibonacci string is a Fibonacci number, and similarly there exists a corresponding Fibonacci string for each Fibonacci number.

Fibonacci strings appear as inputs for the worst case in some computer algorithms.

If "a" and "b" represent two different materials or atomic bond lengths, the structure corresponding to a Fibonacci string is a Fibonacci quasicrystal, an aperiodic quasicrystal structure with unusual spectral properties.

== Convolved Fibonacci sequences ==
A convolved Fibonacci sequence is obtained applying a convolution operation to the Fibonacci sequence one or more times. Specifically, define

$$F_n^{(0)}=F_n$$

and

$$F_n^{(k)}=\sum_{i=0}^n F_i F_{n-i}^{(k-1)}$$

The first few sequences are

$k = 1$: 0, 0, 1, 2, 5, 10, 20, 38, 71, … (sequence A001629 in the OEIS).
$k = 2$: 0, 0, 0, 1, 3, 9, 22, 51, 111, … (sequence A001628 in the OEIS).
$k = 3$: 0, 0, 0, 0, 1, 4, 14, 40, 105, … (sequence A001872 in the OEIS).

The sequences can be calculated using the recurrence

$$F_{n+1}^{(k)}=F_n^{(k)}+F_{n-1}^{(k)}+F_n^{(k-1)}$$

The generating function of the $k$th convolution is

$s^{(k)}(x)=\sum_{n=0}^{\infty} F^{(k)}_n x^n=\left(\frac{x}{1-x-x^2}\right)^k$.

The sequences are related to the sequence of Fibonacci polynomials by the relation

$$F_n^{(k)}=k! F_n^{(k)}(1)$$

where $F^{(k)}_n(x)$ is the $k$th derivative of $F_n(x)$. Equivalently, $F^{(k)}_n$ is the coefficient of $(x - 1)^k$ when $F^{(k)}(x)$ is expanded in powers of $(x - 1)$.

The first convolution, $F^{(1)}_n$ can be written in terms of the Fibonacci and Lucas numbers as

$$F_n^{(1)}=\frac{nL_n-F_n}{5}$$

and follows the recurrence

$F_{n+1}^{(1)}=2F_n^{(1)}+F_{n-1}^{(1)}-2F_{n-2}^{(1)}-F_{n-3}^{(1)}$.

Similar expressions can be found for $k > 1$ with increasing complexity as $k$ increases. The numbers $F^{(1)}_n$ are the row sums of Hosoya's triangle.

As with Fibonacci numbers, there are several combinatorial interpretations of these sequences. For example $F^{(1)}_n$ is the number of ways $n - 2$ can be written as an ordered sum involving only 0, 1, and 2 with 0 used exactly once. In particular $F^{(1)}_4 = 5$ and 2 can be written 0 + 1 + 1, 0 + 2, 1 + 0 + 1, 1 + 1 + 0, 2 + 0.

== Other generalizations ==
The Fibonacci polynomials are another generalization of Fibonacci numbers.

The Padovan sequence is generated by the recurrence $P(n) = P(n - 2) + P(n - 3)$.

The Narayana's cows sequence is generated by the recurrence $N(n) = N(n - 1) + N(n - 3)$.

A random Fibonacci sequence can be defined by tossing a coin for each position $n$ of the sequence and taking $F(n) = F(n - 1) + F(n - 2)$ if it lands heads and $F(n) = F(n - 1) - F(n - 2)$ if it lands tails. Work by Furstenberg and Kesten guarantees that this sequence almost surely grows exponentially at a constant rate: the constant is independent of the coin tosses and was computed in 1999 by Divakar Viswanath. It is now known as Viswanath's constant.

A repfigit, or Keith number, is an integer such that, when its digits start a Fibonacci sequence with that number of digits, the original number is eventually reached. An example is 47, because the Fibonacci sequence starting with 4 and 7 (4, 7, 11, 18, 29, 47) reaches 47. A repfigit can be a tribonacci sequence if there are 3 digits in the number, a tetranacci number if the number has four digits, etc. The first few repfigits are:

14, 19, 28, 47, 61, 75, 197, 742, 1104, 1537, 2208, 2580, 3684, 4788, 7385, 7647, 7909, … (sequence A007629 in the OEIS)

Since the set of sequences satisfying the relation $S(n) = S(n - 1) + S(n - 2)$ is closed under termwise addition and under termwise multiplication by a constant, it can be viewed as a vector space. Any such sequence is uniquely determined by a choice of two elements, so the vector space is two-dimensional. If we abbreviate such a sequence as $(S(0), S(1))$, the Fibonacci sequence $F(n) = (0, 1)$ and the shifted Fibonacci sequence $F(n - 1) = (1, 0)$ are seen to form a canonical basis for this space, yielding the identity:

$$S(n) = S(0) F(n-1) + S(1) F(n)$$

for all such sequences S. For example, if S is the Lucas sequence 2, 1, 3, 4, 7, 11, ..., then we obtain

$L(n) = 2F(n-1) + F(n)$.

=== k-generated Fibonacci sequence ===
Given an integer $k \ge 2$ , the k-generalized Fibonacci sequence $\{F_n^{(k)}\}_{n\in \mathbb {Z}}$ is defined by the recurrence relation

$$\begin{aligned} F_n^{(k)} = F_{n-1}^{(k)} + F_{n-2}^{(k)} + \cdots + F_{n-k}^{(k)}, \quad \text {for all} \ n \ge 2, \end{aligned}$$

with initial values $F_{2-k}^{(k)} = \cdots = F_{-1}^{(k)} = F_{0}^{(k)} = 0$ and $F_1^{(k)} = 1$.

Sequence	N	OEIS sequence
Fibonacci sequence	6	A000045
Pell sequence	12	A000129
Jacobsthal sequence	18	A001045
Narayana's cows sequence	10	A000930
Padovan sequence	15	A000931
Third-order Pell sequence	20	A008998
Tribonacci sequence	30	A000073
Tetranacci sequence	210	A000288

=== Semi-Fibonacci sequence ===
The semi-Fibonacci sequence (sequence A030067 in the OEIS) is defined via the same recursion for odd-indexed terms $a(2n+1) = a(2n) + a(2n-1)$ and $a(1) = 1$, but for even indices $a(2n) = a(n)$, $n \ge 1$. The bisection A030068 of odd-indexed terms $s(n) = a(2n-1)$ therefore verifies $s(n+1) = s(n) + a(n)$ and is strictly increasing. It yields the set of the semi-Fibonacci numbers

1, 2, 3, 5, 6, 9, 11, 16, 17, 23, 26, 35, 37, 48, 53, 69, 70, 87, 93, 116, 119, 145, 154, ... (sequence A030068 in the OEIS)

which occur as $s(n) = a(2^k(2n-1)), k=0,1,\ldots$.
