= Origamics =

Book on the mathematics of paper folding

Origamics: Mathematical Explorations Through Paper Folding
- Author: Kazuo Hago
- Translator: Josefina C. Fonacier and Masami Isoda
- Genre: Mathematics
- Publisher: World Scientific
- Publication date: 2008

Origamics: Mathematical Explorations Through Paper Folding is a book on the mathematics of paper folding by Kazuo Haga, a Japanese retired biology professor. It was edited and translated into English by Josefina C. Fonacier and Masami Isoda, based on material published in several Japanese-language books by Haga, and published in 2008 by World Scientific. The title is a portmanteau of "origami" and "mathematics", coined in the 1990s by Haga to describe the type of paper-folding mathematical exploration that would later be described in this book.

== Topics ==
Although much of its content involves folding square sheets of origami paper, the book focuses on mathematical explorations developing from folding and unfolding paper rather than on the traditional use of origami to create paper figures and artworks. It is divided into ten chapters, exploring concepts in paper folding that are "so simple that they could be discovered by middle- or high-school students".

The book begins with the exploration of a single fold of a corner of a square to a midpoint of an opposite edge, and its analysis involving the geometry of the 3–4–5 right triangle. Later explorations (sometimes presented with colorful stories of knights and princesses as motivation) concern folding one or more corners of the square to other points on the square, similar folds on paper with the shape of a silver rectangle (such as A4 letter paper), the interactions of the fold lines produced in this way, and the use of these folds to obtain subdivisions of the interval into different numbers of parts.

== Audience and reception ==
The book is primarily aimed at secondary-school mathematics teachers, and reviewer Gertraud Ehrig suggests that this book would be particularly helpful for them in providing inspiration for activities for their students.

Although the many activities discussed throughout the book are suitable for discovery learning by students, it also includes more technical material proving the mathematical insights found through these activities. These parts use only elementary methods in Euclidean geometry, such as the Pythagorean theorem and the use of triangle centers, and may be best omitted when presenting this material to students.
