= Supersilver ratio =

Number, approximately 2.20557

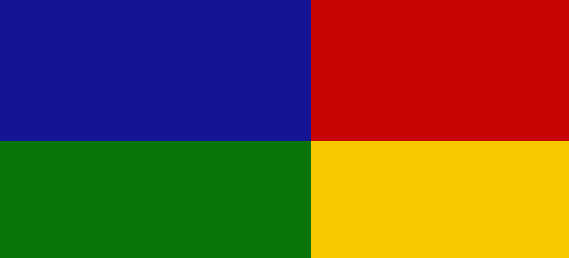
- A supersilver rectangle contains two scaled copies of itself, ς = ((ς − 1)^{2} + 2(ς − 1) + 1) / ς
- Rationality: irrational algebraic
- Symbol: ς

Representations
- Decimal: 2.20556943040059031170...
- Algebraic form: real root of x^{3} = 2x^{2} + 1
- Continued fraction (linear): [2;4,1,6,2,1,1,1,1,1,1,2,2,1,2,1,...] not periodic infinite

In mathematics, the supersilver ratio is a geometrical proportion, given by the unique real solution of the equation x^{3} = 2x^{2} + 1. Its decimal expansion begins with 2.2055694304005903... (sequence A356035 in the OEIS).

The name supersilver ratio is by analogy with the silver ratio, the positive solution of the equation x^{2} = 2x + 1, and the supergolden ratio.

== Definition ==
ς = (a+d)/a = a/b = b/(d−a). For b = 1 the boxes have volumes ς^{3} = ς^{2} + 1 (red) + ς^{2} (green).

Three quantities a > b > c > 0 are in the supersilver ratio if
$$\frac{2a+c}{a} =\frac{a}{b} =\frac{b}{c}\,.$$
This ratio is commonly denoted $\varsigma$. (Note: a + c = d in the vector image on the right.)

Substituting $a=\varsigma \,b = \varsigma^2 c$ in the first fraction gives
$$\varsigma =\frac{2\varsigma^2 c + c}{\varsigma^2 c}.$$
It follows that the supersilver ratio is the unique real solution of the cubic equation $\varsigma^3 -2\varsigma^2 -1 =0.$

The minimal polynomial for the reciprocal root is the depressed cubic $x^3 +2x -1,$ thus the simplest solution with Cardano's formula,
$$\begin{align}
w_{1,2} &=\left( 1 \pm \frac{1}{3} \sqrt{ \frac{59}{3}} \right) /2 \\
1 /\varsigma &=\sqrt[3]{w_1} +\sqrt[3]{w_2} \end{align}$$
or, using the hyperbolic sine,
$$1 /\varsigma =-2 \sqrt\frac{2}{3} \sinh \left( \frac{1}{3} \operatorname{arsinh} \left( -\frac{3}{4} \sqrt\frac{3}{2} \right) \right).$$

$1 /\varsigma$ is the superstable fixed point of the Newton's method iteration $x \to (2x^3 +1) /(3x^2 +2).$

Dividing the defining trinomial $x^3 -2x^2 -1$ by $x -\varsigma$ one obtains $x^2 +x /\varsigma^2 +1 /\varsigma ,$ and the conjugate elements of $\varsigma$ are
$$x_{1,2} = \left( -1 \pm i \sqrt{8\varsigma^2 +3} \right) /2 \varsigma^2,$$
with $x_1 +x_2 = 2 -\varsigma \;$ and $\; x_1 x_2 =1 /\varsigma.$

Multiply the minimal polynomial by $x$, and rearrange the relation as $(x^2 +1)^2 =x +1.$ This results in the iteration $\, x_{n+1} \to \sqrt{-1 +\sqrt{1 +x_n \phantom{|} }},$ with initial value $x_0 >0$, and the infinite radical
$$1/\varsigma =\sqrt{-1 +\sqrt{1 +\sqrt{-1 +\sqrt{1 +\cdots \phantom{|} }}}}$$

Its counterpart is found by using polynomial $f:z^3 +z^2 -z -2$, which has real zero $\varsigma -1$. Multiply $f$ by $z-1$, then $(z^2 -1)^2 =z -1,$ and the corresponding iteration with $z_0 >1$ gives
$$\varsigma -1 =\sqrt{1 +\sqrt{-1 +\sqrt{1 +\sqrt{-1 +\cdots \phantom{|} }}}}$$

=== Supersilver Julia sets ===
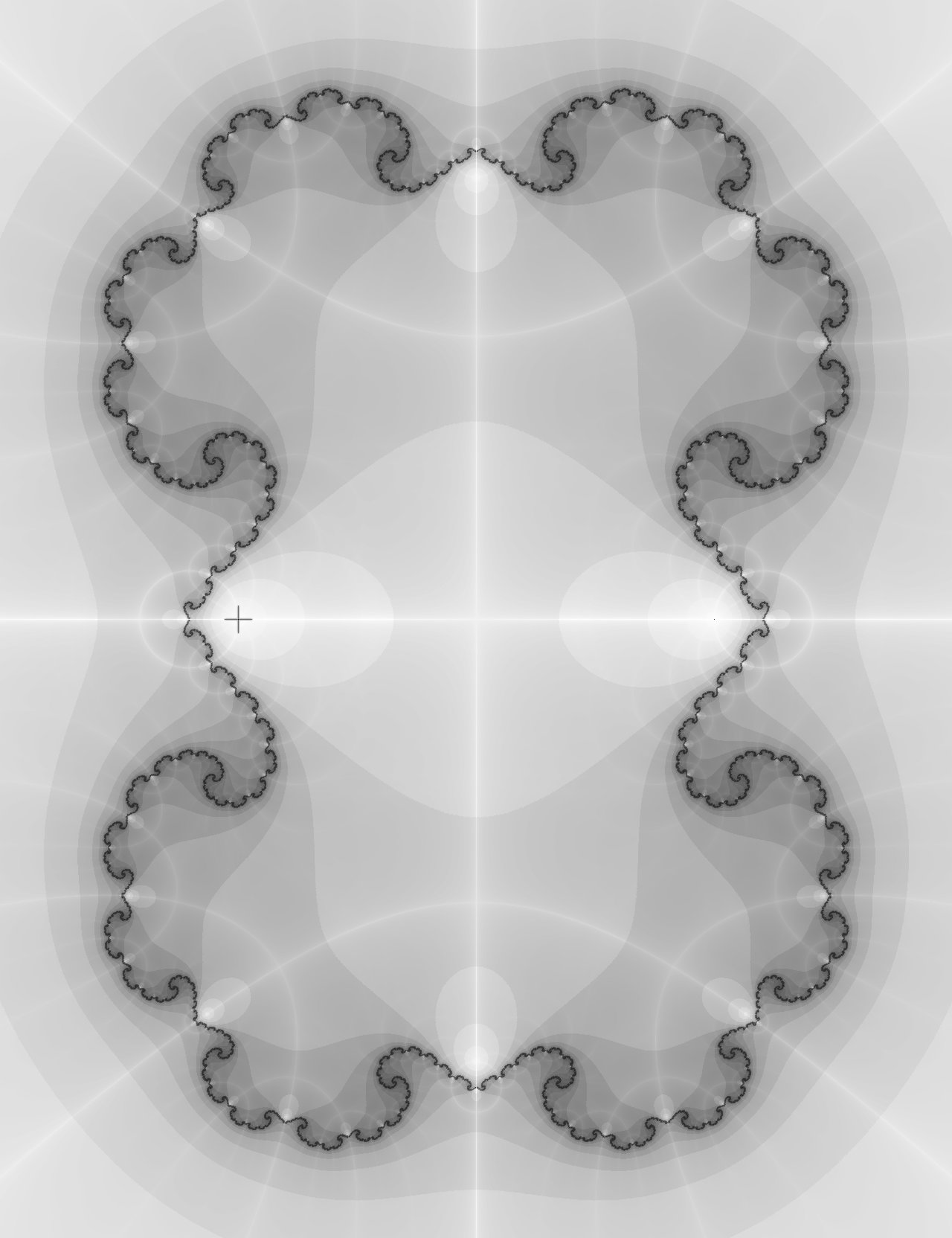
Julia set (in black) of the map z → (2 − z^{2})/(z^{2} − 1) with fixed point z_{f} = ς − 1.

Julia set of the map r → (4 − r^{2})/(r^{2} − 2) with fixed point r_{f} = 2 / (ς − 1).

Both images are centred at critical point 0. Critical value −2 is on the left border, the negative pole is at the cross, and the real fixed point is on the right hand side.

Both systems have linear convergence rate $\,\log_{10} \tfrac{4(\varsigma -1)}{\varsigma} =0.339 \ldots$ In order to improve this constant, divide both sides of $z^3 =z(1-z) +2 \,\text{ by } z,$ and substitute $1 /\varsigma =1 /(z+1) \,$ for $\, 2/z -z$, resulting in the iteration $z_{n+1} \to \sqrt{1 +\frac{1}{1 +z_n}},$ and the continued reciprocal square root
$$\varsigma -1 =\sqrt{1 +\cfrac{1}{1+\sqrt{1 +\cfrac{1}{1+\sqrt{1 +\cfrac{1}{1 +\ddots}}}}}}$$

For complex initial points $z_0$ other than $-1$ this method converges with linear rate $\,\log_{10} 2(\varsigma^2 +1) =1.069 \ldots,$ provided the principal root is chosen at each step. If randomly either the principal root or its negative is picked, the orbit of $z_0$ is attracted to a simple closed curve, which is the Julia set $J$ of the backward iteration $z_{n-1} \to \frac{1}{z^2_n -1} -1.$

The critical points $z_c$ for which the derivative $-2z /(z^2 -1)^2$ vanishes are $0$ and $-\infty$. The latter is mapped into the right neighborhood of the pole $z_p =-1$ and vice versa, so $\{-\infty,-1\}$ is the single attracting limit set.

The counterpart of this system, with equal rate of convergence, is derived from $r^3 =r(2-r) +4 \,$ with real root $\frac{2}{\varsigma -1},$ numerically 1.658967... Divide both sides by $r$, and substitute $2 /\,\varsigma(\varsigma -1) =2 /(r+1) \,$ for $\, 4/r -r$, resulting in the iterations
$$\begin{align}
r_{n+1} &\to \sqrt{2 +\frac{2}{1 +r_n}} \\
r_{n-1} &\to \frac{2}{r^2_n -2} -1.\end{align}$$
The backward iteration has derivative $-4r /(r^2 -2)^2$, thus the critical points remain unchanged, and the attracting limit set is $\{-2,0\}$.

On $J$, the repelling, real fixed points are $z_f =\varsigma -1 \,$ and $\, r_f =2 /z_f$. The first preimage is the negative thereof, the second are the purely imaginary pairs $z_i =\pm i\sqrt{ \varsigma^2 -1}\,$ and $\, r_i =2 /z_i$.

The largest spirals in the left half of each image are centred at respective complex fixed points
$$\begin{align}
z_{1,2} &=\left( -\varsigma \pm \frac{i}{\varsigma} \sqrt{3\varsigma +2} \right) /2 \\
r_{1,2} &=(\varsigma -1) \, z_{1,2} \end{align}$$
with
$$\begin{align}
z_1 z_2 &=2 /(\varsigma -1) \\
r_1 r_2 &=2(\varsigma -1).\end{align}$$
The outward winding iterates in the neighborhood of these fixed points trace a logarithmic spiral with parameter $k =\ln(\rho) /\theta =\pm 0.0534 \ldots$ Modulus $\rho =\sqrt{ \tfrac{8}{\varsigma^2 +1} }$ and argument $\theta \approx \pm 0.925\pi \,$ are given by the complex derivatives. In accordance with the periodicity of the systems, the inclination $\theta$ of the tangent ray tends toward $\pi$.

== Properties ==
Rectangles with aspect ratios ς−1, ς/(ς−1), and ς tile the square.

The growth rate of the average value of the n-th term of a random Fibonacci sequence is $\varsigma - 1$.

The defining equation can be written
$$\begin{align}
1 &=\frac{1}{\varsigma -1} +\frac{1}{\varsigma^2 +1} \\
&=\frac{1}{\varsigma} +\frac{\varsigma -1}{\varsigma +1} +\frac{\varsigma -2}{\varsigma -1}.\end{align}$$

The supersilver ratio can be expressed in terms of itself as fractions
$$\begin{align}
(\varsigma -1)^2 &=\frac{\varsigma +1}{\varsigma} \\
\varsigma &=\frac{\varsigma}{\varsigma -1} +\frac{\varsigma -1}{\varsigma +1} \\
\varsigma(\varsigma -1) &=\varsigma +\tfrac{1}{\varsigma} =\frac{\varsigma +1}{\varsigma -1} \\
\varsigma^2 -1 &=\varsigma +\frac{2}{\varsigma -1} =\frac{1}{\varsigma -2} -1.\end{align}$$

Similarly as the infinite geometric series
$$\begin{align}
\frac{\varsigma}{\varsigma -1} &=\sum_{n=0}^{\infty} \varsigma^{-n} \\
\frac{\varsigma}{(\varsigma -1)^3} &=\sum_{n=0}^{\infty} \varsigma^{-2n} \\
\frac{\varsigma}{2} &=\sum_{n=0}^{\infty} \varsigma^{-3n},\end{align}$$

in comparison to the silver ratio identities
$$\begin{align}
\frac{\sigma}{\sigma -1} &=\sum_{n=0}^{\infty} \sigma^{-n} \\
\frac{\sigma}{2} &=\sum_{n=0}^{\infty} \sigma^{-2n} \\
\frac{\sigma^2}{\sigma +3} &=\sum_{n=0}^{\infty} \sigma^{-3n}.\end{align}$$

For every integer $n$ one has
$$\begin{align}
\varsigma^n &=2\varsigma^{n-1} +\varsigma^{n-3} \\
&=4\varsigma^{n-2} +\varsigma^{n-3} +2\varsigma^{n-4} \\
&=\varsigma^{n-1} +2\varsigma^{n-2} +\varsigma^{n-3} +\varsigma^{n-4} \end{align}$$
from this an infinite number of further relations can be found.

Continued fraction pattern of a few low powers
$$\begin{align}
\varsigma^{-2} &=[0;4,1,6,2,1,1,1,1,1,1,...] \approx 0.2056 \;(\tfrac{5}{24}) \\
\varsigma^{-1} &=[0;2,4,1,6,2,1,1,1,1,1,...] \approx 0.4534 \;(\tfrac{5}{11}) \\
\varsigma^0 &=[1] \\
\varsigma^1 &=[2;4,1,6,2,1,1,1,1,1,1,...] \approx 2.2056 \;(\tfrac{53}{24}) \\
\varsigma^2 &=[4;1,6,2,1,1,1,1,1,1,2,...] \approx 4.8645 \;(\tfrac{73}{15}) \\
\varsigma^3 &=[10;1,2,1,2,4,4,2,2,6,2,...] \approx 10.729 \;(\tfrac{118}{11}) \end{align}$$

As derived from its continued fraction expansion, the simplest rational approximations of $\varsigma$ are:
$$\tfrac{9}{4},\tfrac{11}{5},\tfrac{53}{24},\tfrac{75}{34},\tfrac{161}{73},\tfrac{236}{107},\tfrac{397}{180},\tfrac{633}{287},\tfrac{1030}{467},\tfrac{1663}{754},\tfrac{2693}{1221},\tfrac{7049}{3196}, \ldots$$

Newton's method for p(z) = z^{3} − 2z^{2} − 1: ς (right) and its complex conjugates at the nuclei of their basins of attraction. Julia set of the Newton map in orange, with unit circle and real curve for reference.

The supersilver ratio is a Pisot number. By definition of these numbers, the absolute value $1 /\sqrt{\varsigma}$ of the algebraic conjugates is smaller than 1, so powers of $\varsigma$ generate almost integers. For example: $\varsigma^{10} =2724.00146856...$ $\approx 2724 +1/681$. After ten rotation steps the phases of the inward spiraling conjugate pair – initially close to $\pm 45 \pi/82$ – nearly align with the imaginary axis.

The minimal polynomial of the supersilver ratio $m(x) =x^3 -2x^2 -1$ has discriminant $\Delta=-59$ and factors into $(x -21)^{2}(x -19) \pmod{59};\;$ the imaginary quadratic field $K = \mathbb{Q}( \sqrt{\Delta})$ has class number $h=3$. Thus, the Hilbert class field of $K$ can be formed by adjoining $\varsigma$. With argument $\tau=(1 +\sqrt{\Delta})/2\,$ a generator for the ring of integers of $K$, the real root j(τ) of the Hilbert class polynomial is given by $(\varsigma^{-6} -27\varsigma^{6} -6)^{3}.$

The Weber-Ramanujan class invariant is approximated with error < 3.5 ∙ 10^{−20} by
$$\sqrt{2}\,\mathfrak{f}( \sqrt{ \Delta} ) = \sqrt[4]{2}\,G_{59} \approx (e^{\pi \sqrt{- \Delta}} + 24)^{1/24},$$
while its true value is the single real root of the polynomial
$$W_{59}(x) = x^9 -4x^8 +4x^7 -2x^6 +4x^5 -8x^4 +4x^3 -8x^2 +16x -8.$$

The elliptic integral singular value $k_{r} =\lambda^{*}(r) \text{ for } r =59$ has closed form expression
$$\lambda^{*}(59) =\sin ( \arcsin \left( G_{59}^{-12} \right) /2)$$
(which is less than 1/294 the eccentricity of the orbit of Venus).

== Third-order Pell sequences ==
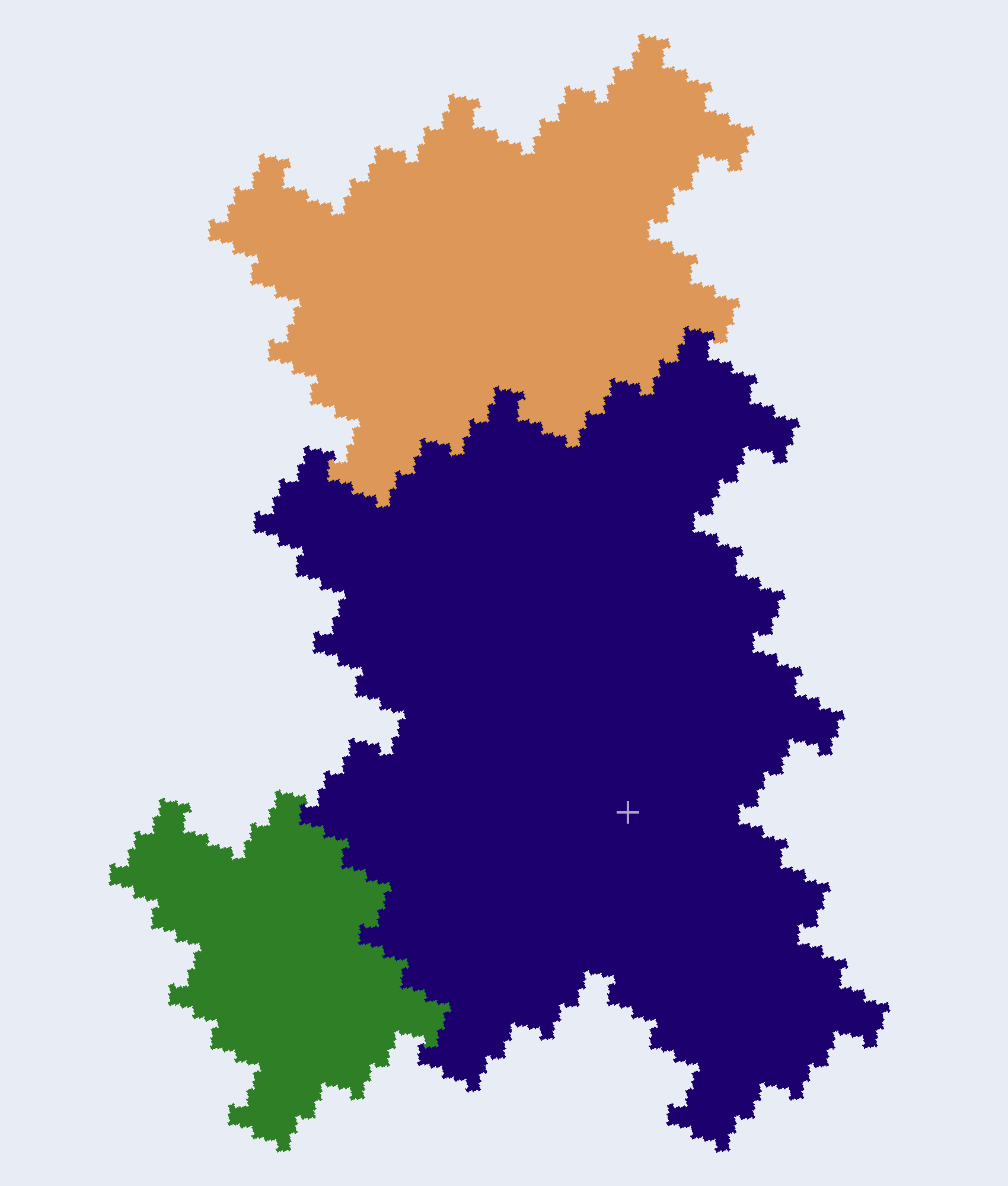
Hop o' my Thumb: a supersilver Rauzy fractal of type a ↦ baa. The fractal boundary has box-counting dimension 1.22

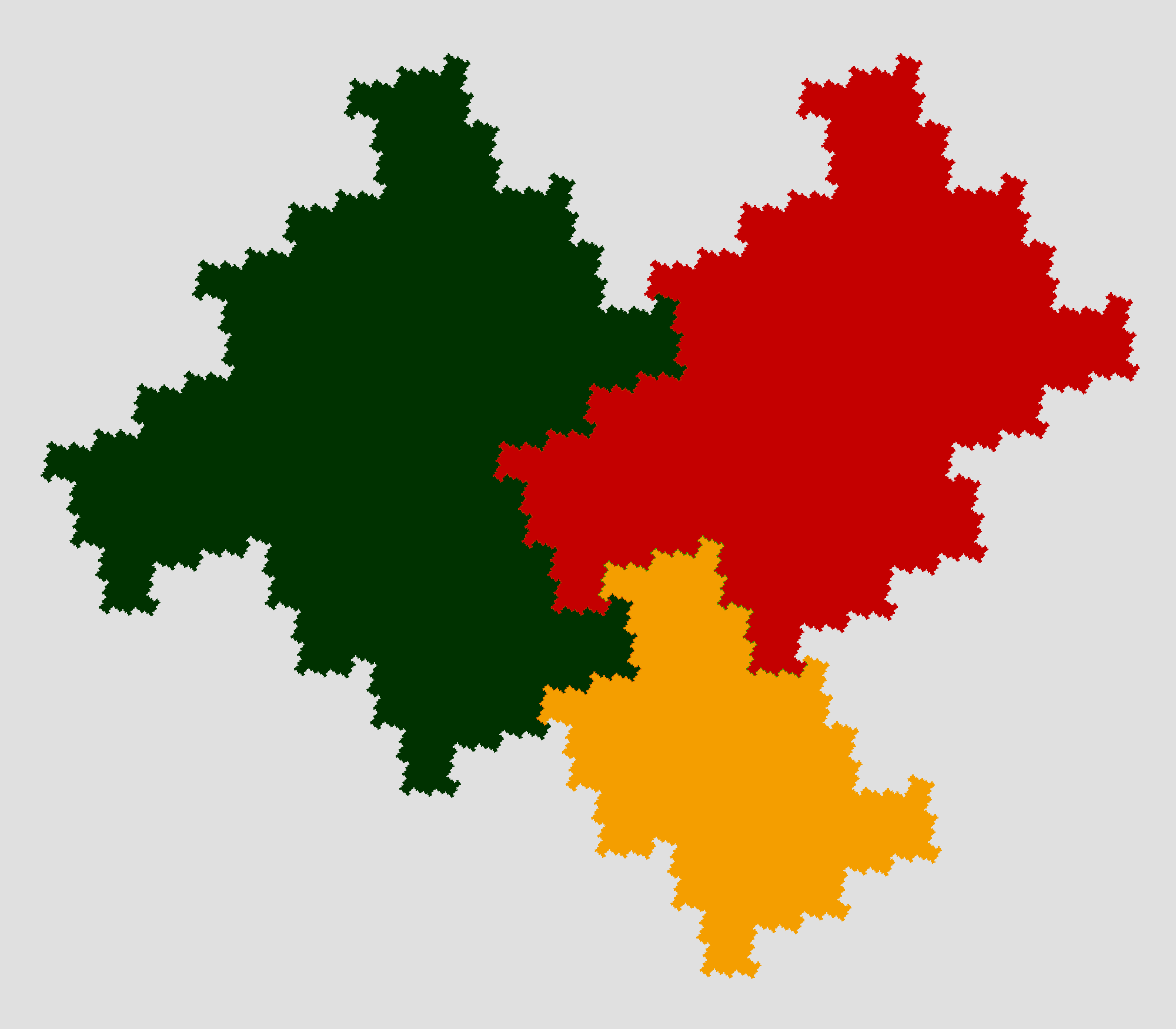
A supersilver Rauzy fractal of type c ↦ bca, with areas in the ratios ς^{2} + 1 : ς (ς − 1) : ς : 1.

These numbers are related to the supersilver ratio as the Pell numbers and Pell-Lucas numbers are to the silver ratio.

The fundamental sequence is defined by the third-order recurrence relation
$$S_n =2S_{n-1} +S_{n-3} \text{ for } n > 2,$$
with initial values
$$S_0 =1, S_1 =2, S_2 =4.$$

The first few terms are 1, 2, 4, 9, 20, 44, 97, 214, 472, 1041, 2296, 5064,... (sequence A008998 in the OEIS). The limit ratio between consecutive terms is the supersilver ratio:$\lim_{n\rightarrow\infty} S_{n+1}/S_n =\varsigma.$

The generating function of the sequence is
$$\frac{1}{1 -2x -x^3} =\sum_{n=0}^{\infty} S_n x^n \text{ for } x <\tfrac{1}{\varsigma}$$

Taking the sum of the first $n$ terms gives
$$\frac12 (S_{n-2} +S_{n-1} +S_n -1) =\sum_{k=0}^{n-1} {S_k}$$

Expressing the terms as sums of binomial coefficients
$$S_n =\sum_{k =0}^{\lfloor n /3 \rfloor}{n -2k \choose k} \cdot 2^{n -3k}$$

The sequence is extended to negative indices using
$$S_n =S_{n+3} -2S_{n+2},$$
obtaining (1), 0, 0, 1, 0,−2, 1, 4,−4,−7, 12, 10,... (sequence A077965 in the OEIS).

Powers of the supersilver ratio can be written with third-order Pell numbers as quadratic coefficients
$$\varsigma^n =\varsigma^2 S_{n-2} +\varsigma S_{n-4} +S_{n-3},$$
which is proved by mathematical induction on $n$. This relation also holds for $n < 0$. The order of the coefficients corresponds to the bottom row of matrix $Q$ below.

The characteristic equation of the recurrence is $x^3 -2x^2 -1 =0 .$ If the three solutions are real root $\varsigma$ and conjugate pair $\beta$ and $\gamma$, the supersilver numbers are given by the Binet formula
$$S_{n-1} =a \varsigma^n +b \beta^n +c \gamma^n ,$$
with real $a$ and conjugates $b$ and $c$ the roots of $59x^3 -6x -1 =0.$

Since $\left\vert b \beta^n +c \gamma^n \right\vert < \varsigma^{-n/2}$, the number $S_n$ is the nearest integer to $\,a\,\varsigma^{n+1}$, with $n \ge 0$ and coefficient $a =\varsigma^2 /(\varsigma^3 +2) =$ 0.3821595259060121635462213...

Coefficients $a =b =c =1$ result in the Binet formula for the related sequence $A_n =S_n +2S_{n-3}.$

The first few terms are 3, 2, 4, 11, 24, 52, 115, 254, 560, 1235, 2724, 6008,... (sequence A332647 in the OEIS).

This third-order Pell-Lucas sequence has the Fermat property: if p is prime, $A_{p} \equiv A_1 \bmod p.$ The converse does not hold, but the small number of odd pseudoprimes $\,n \mid (A_n -2)$ makes the sequence special. The 14 odd composite numbers below 10^{8} to pass the test are n = 3^{2}, 5^{2}, 5^{3}, 315, 99297, 222443, 418625, 9122185, 3257^{2}, 11889745, 20909625, 24299681, 64036831, 76917325.

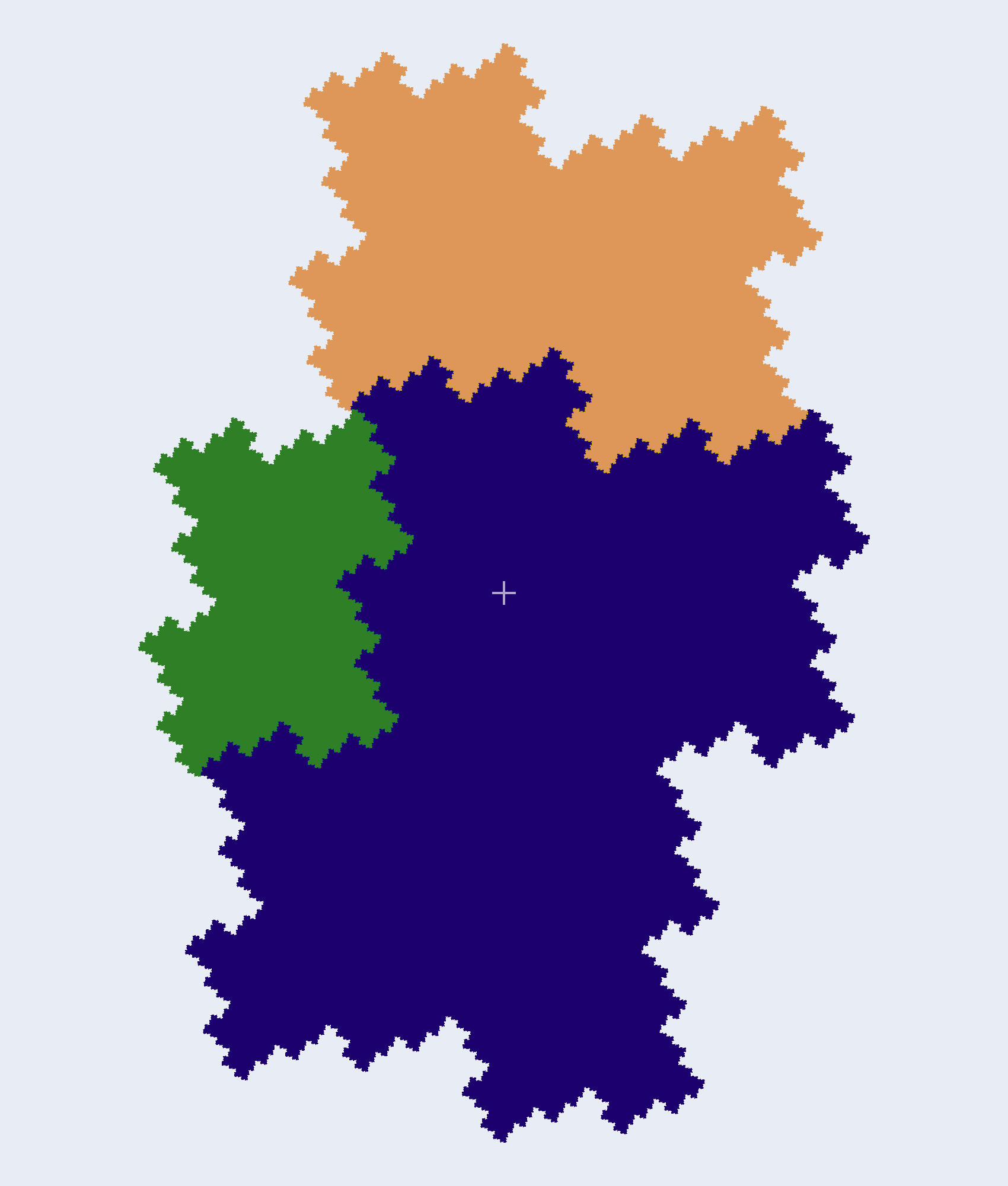
The Pilgrim: a supersilver Rauzy fractal of type a ↦ aba. The three subtiles have areas in ratio ς.

The third-order Pell numbers are obtained as integral powers n > 3 of a matrix with real eigenvalue $\varsigma$
$$Q = \begin{pmatrix} 2 & 0 & 1 \\ 1 & 0 & 0 \\ 0 & 1 & 0 \end{pmatrix} ,$$

$$Q^n = \begin{pmatrix} S_n & S_{n-2} & S_{n-1} \\ S_{n-1} & S_{n-3} & S_{n-2} \\ S_{n-2} & S_{n-4} & S_{n-3} \end{pmatrix}$$

The trace of $Q^n$ gives the above $A_n$.

Alternatively, $Q$ can be interpreted as incidence matrix for a D0L Lindenmayer system on the alphabet $\{a,b,c\}$ with corresponding substitution rule
$$\begin{cases}
a \;\mapsto \;aab \\
b \;\mapsto \;c \\
c \;\mapsto \;a \end{cases}$$
and initiator $w_0=b$. The series of words $w_n$ produced by iterating the substitution have lengths $l(w_n) =S_{n-2} +S_{n-3} +S_{n-4}.$ The number of c, b and a's in each word is equal to successive third-order Pell numbers.

Associated to this string rewriting process is a compact set composed of self-similar tiles called the Rauzy fractal, that visualizes the combinatorial information contained in a multiple-generation three-letter sequence.

== Supersilver rectangle ==
Powers of ς within a supersilver rectangle.

Given a rectangle of height 1, length $\varsigma$ and diagonal length $\varsigma \sqrt{\varsigma -1}.$ The triangles on the diagonal have altitudes $1 /\sqrt{\varsigma -1}\,;$ each perpendicular foot divides the diagonal in ratio $\varsigma^2$.

On the right-hand side, cut off a square of side length 1 and mark the intersection with the falling diagonal. The remaining rectangle now has aspect ratio $1 +1/ \varsigma^2:1$ (according to $\varsigma =2 +1/ \varsigma^2$). Divide the original rectangle into four parts by a second, horizontal cut passing through the intersection point.

The parent supersilver rectangle and the two scaled copies along the diagonal have linear sizes in the ratios $\varsigma:\varsigma -1:1.$ The areas of the rectangles opposite the diagonal are both equal to $(\varsigma -1)/ \varsigma,$ with aspect ratios $\varsigma(\varsigma -1)$ (below) and $\varsigma /(\varsigma -1)$ (above).

If the diagram is further subdivided by perpendicular lines through the feet of the altitudes, the lengths of the diagonal and its seven distinct subsections are in ratios $\varsigma^2 +1:\varsigma^2:\varsigma^2 -1:\varsigma +1:$ $\, \varsigma(\varsigma -1):\varsigma:2/(\varsigma -1):1.$

=== Supersilver spiral ===
Supersilver spirals with different initial angles on a ς− rectangle.

A supersilver spiral is a logarithmic spiral that gets wider by a factor of $\varsigma$ for every quarter turn. It is described by the polar equation $r( \theta) =a \exp(k \theta),$ with initial radius $a$ and parameter $k =\frac{2}{\pi} \ln( \varsigma).$ If drawn on a supersilver rectangle, the spiral has its pole at the foot of altitude of a triangle on the diagonal and passes through vertices of rectangles with aspect ratio $\varsigma(\varsigma -1)$ which are perpendicularly aligned and successively scaled by a factor $\varsigma^{-1}$. The pole of the spiral divides the diagonal of the lower right rectangle in ratio $\varsigma$.

== See also ==
Solutions of equations similar to $x^3 =2x^2 +1$:

- Silver ratio – the positive solution of the equation $x^2 =2x +1$
- Golden ratio – the positive solution of the equation $x^2 =x +1$
- Supergolden ratio – the real solution of the equation $x^3 =x^2 +1$
