= Hosoya's triangle =

Triangular arrangement of numbers based on the Fibonacci numbers

Hosoya's triangle or the Hosoya triangle (originally Fibonacci triangle; OEIS: A058071) is a triangular arrangement of numbers (like Pascal's triangle) based on the Fibonacci numbers. Each number is the sum of the two numbers above in either the left diagonal or the right diagonal.

$\begin{array}{c} 1 \\ 1 \quad 1 \\ 2 \quad 1 \quad 2 \\ 3 \quad 2 \quad 2 \quad 3 \\ 5 \quad 3 \quad 4 \quad 3 \quad 5 \\ 8 \quad 5 \quad 6 \quad 6 \quad 5 \quad 8 \\ 13 \quad 8 \quad 10 \quad 9 \quad 10 \quad 8 \quad 13 \\ 21 \quad 13 \quad 16 \quad 15 \quad 15 \quad 16 \quad 13 \quad 21 \\ 34 \quad 21 \quad 26 \quad 24 \quad 25 \quad 24 \quad 26 \quad 21 \quad 34 \\ 55 \quad 34 \quad 42 \quad 39 \quad 40 \quad 40 \quad 39 \quad 42 \quad 34 \quad 55 \\ 89 \quad 55 \quad 68 \quad 63 \quad 65 \quad 64 \quad 65 \quad 63 \quad 68 \quad 55 \quad 89 \\ 144 \quad 89 \quad 110 \quad 102 \quad 105 \quad 104 \quad 104 \quad 105 \quad 102 \quad 110 \quad 89 \quad 144 \\ \end{array}$
A diagram showing the first 12 rows of Hosoya's triangle

== Name ==
The name "Fibonacci triangle" has also been used for triangles composed of Fibonacci numbers or related numbers or triangles with Fibonacci sides and integral area, hence is ambiguous.

== Recurrence ==
The numbers in this triangle obey the recurrence relations

$$H(0,0)=H(1,0)=H(1,1)=H(2,1)=1$$

and

$$\begin {align}
H(n,j)&=H(n-1,j)+H(n-2,j)\\
&=H(n-1,j-1)+H(n-2,j-2).
\end {align}$$

== Relation to Fibonacci numbers ==
The entries in the triangle satisfy the identity

$$H(n,i)=F(i+1)\cdot F(n-i+1)$$

Thus, the two outermost diagonals are the Fibonacci numbers, while the numbers on the middle vertical line are the squares of the Fibonacci numbers. All the other numbers in the triangle are the product of two distinct Fibonacci numbers greater than 1. The row sums are the first convolved Fibonacci numbers.
