= Silver ratio =

Number, approximately 2.41421

- Rationality: irrational algebraic
- Symbol: σ

Representations
- Decimal: 2.41421356237309504880...
- Algebraic form: $1 + \sqrt{2}$
- Continued fraction: $2 + \cfrac{1}{2 + \cfrac{1}{2 + \cfrac{1}{\ddots}}}$ purely periodic infinite

In mathematics, the silver ratio is a geometrical proportion with exact value 1 + √2, the positive solution of the equation x^{2} = 2x + 1.

The name silver ratio is by analogy with the golden ratio, the positive solution of the equation x^{2} = x + 1.

Although its name is recent, the silver ratio (or silver mean) has been studied since ancient times because of its connections to the square root of 2, almost-isosceles Pythagorean triples, square triangular numbers, Pell numbers, the octagon, and six polyhedra with octahedral symmetry.

Silver rectangle in a regular octagon.

== Definition ==
If the ratio of two quantities a > b > 0 is proportionate to the sum of two and their reciprocal ratio, they are in the silver ratio:
$$\frac{a}{b} =\frac{2a+b}{a}$$
The ratio $\frac{a}{b}$ is here denoted $\sigma.$ (Note: Variously T(2), S_{2}, δ_{S}, σ_{Ag}. The last notation is adopted without the subscript, which is relevant only to the context of metallic means.)

Substituting $a=\sigma b \,$ in the second fraction,
$$\sigma =\frac{b(2\sigma +1)}{\sigma b}.$$
It follows that the silver ratio is the positive solution of quadratic equation $\sigma^2 -2\sigma -1 =0.$ The quadratic formula gives the two solutions $1 \pm \sqrt{2},$ the decimal expansion of the positive root begins with 2.414213562373095... (sequence A014176 in the OEIS).

Using the tangent function
$$\sigma =\tan \left( \frac{3\pi}{8} \right) =\cot \left( \frac{\pi}{8} \right),$$
or the hyperbolic sine
$$\sigma =\exp( \operatorname{arsinh}(1) ).$$

$\sigma$ and its algebraic conjugate can be written as sums of eighth roots of unity:
$$\begin{align}
\text{with } \omega =&\ \exp(2\pi i/8) =\sqrt{i}, \\
\sigma &=\omega -\omega^4 +\omega^{-1} \\
-\sigma^{-1} &=\omega^3 -\omega^4 +\omega^{-3} ,\end{align}$$
which is guaranteed by the Kronecker–Weber theorem.

$\sigma$ is the superstable fixed point of the Newton iteration $x \to \tfrac12 (x^2 +1) /(x -1), \text{ with } x_0 \in [2,3]$

The iteration $x \to \sqrt{1 +2x \phantom{|} }$ results in the continued radical
$$\sigma =\sqrt{1 +2\sqrt{1 +2\sqrt{1 +2\cdots \phantom{|} }}}$$

== Properties ==
Rectangles with aspect ratios related to σ tile the square.

The defining equation can be written
$$\begin{align}
1 &=\frac{1}{\sigma -1} + \frac{1}{\sigma +1} \\
&=\frac{2}{\sigma +1} + \frac{1}{\sigma}.\end{align}$$

The silver ratio can be expressed in terms of itself as fractions
$$\begin{align}
\sigma &=\frac{1}{\sigma -2} \\
\sigma^2 &=\frac{\sigma -1}{\sigma -2} +\frac{\sigma +1}{\sigma -1}.\end{align}$$

Similarly as the infinite geometric series
$$\begin{align}
\sigma &=2\sum_{n=0}^{\infty} \sigma^{-2n} \\
\sigma^2 &=-1 +2\sum_{n=0}^{\infty} (\sigma -1)^{-n}.\end{align}$$

For every integer $n$ one has
$$\begin{align}
\sigma^n &=2\sigma^{n-1} +\sigma^{n-2} \\
&=\sigma^{n-1} +3\sigma^{n-2} +\sigma^{n-3} \\
&=2\sigma^{n-1} +2\sigma^{n-3} +\sigma^{n-4} \end{align}$$
from this an infinite number of further relations can be found.

Continued fraction pattern of a few low powers
$$\begin{align}
\sigma^{-1} &=[0;2,2,2,2,...] \approx 0.4142 \;(17/41) \\
\sigma^0 &=[1] \\
\sigma^1 &=[2;2,2,2,2,...] \approx 2.4142 \;(70/29) \\
\sigma^2 &=[5;1,4,1,4,...] \approx 5.8284 \;(5 + 29/35) \\
\sigma^3 &=[14;14,14,14,...] \approx 14.0711 \;(14 + 1/14) \\
\sigma^4 &=[33;1,32,1,32,...] \approx 33.9706 \;(33 + 33/34) \\
\sigma^5 &=[82;82,82,82,...] \approx 82.0122 \;(82 + 1/82) \end{align}$$

$$\sigma^{-n} \equiv (-1)^{n-1} \sigma^n \bmod 1.$$

The silver ratio is a Pisot number, the next quadratic Pisot number after the golden ratio. By definition of these numbers, the absolute value $\sqrt{2} -1$ of the algebraic conjugate is smaller than 1, thus powers of $\sigma$ generate almost integers and the sequence $\sigma^n \bmod 1$ is dense at the borders of the unit interval.

=== Quadratic field Q(√2) ===
The mapping ι (ξ) = (ξ̅, ξ) embeds both conjugates of integer ξ = a + bσ into a point-lattice Λ spanned by unit vectors ι (1) and ι (σ). The fundamental parallelogram with area δ(Λ) = √8 in silver; the Minkowski diamond has area 4δ(Λ).

$\sigma$ is the fundamental unit of real quadratic field $K =\mathbb{Q}\left( \sqrt{2} \right)$ with discriminant $\Delta_k =8.$ The integers $\mathbb{Z}[\sigma] \text{ of } K$ are the numbers $\xi =a +b\sigma \text{ } (a,b \in \mathbb{Z}),$ with conjugate $\overline{\xi} =(a +2b) -b\sigma,$ norm $\xi \overline{\xi} =(a +b)^2 -2b^2$ and trace $\xi +\overline{\xi} =2(a +b).$ The first few positive numbers occurring as norm are 1, 2, 4, 7, 8, 9, 14, 16, 17, 18, 23, 25. Arithmetic in the ring $O_k =\mathbb{Z}[\sigma]$ resembles that of the rational integers, i.e. the elements of $\mathbb{Z}.$ Prime factorization is unique up to order and unit factors $\pm \sigma^{\pm n} (n = 0,1,2,\ldots),$ and there is a Euclidean function on the absolute value of the norm. The primes of $O_k$ are of three types:

- $1 +\sigma$ with norm $2,$ the single rational prime that divides Δ_{k} ,
- the factors $a + b\sigma$ of rational primes $p =8n \pm 1$ with norm $p,$
- the rational primes $p =8n \pm 3$ with norm $p^2,$

and any one of these numbers multiplied by a unit.

The silver ratio can be used as base of a numeral system, here called the sigmary scale. (Note: In what follows, it is assumed that 0 ≤ x ≤ 1. Negative numbers are multiplied by −1 first, and numbers > 1 divided by the least power of σ ≥ x. The sigmary digits are then obtained by successive multiplications with σ, clearing the integer part at each step. Lastly, the 'sigmary point' is restored.) Every real number x in [0,1] can be represented as a convergent series
$$x =\sum_{n=1}^{\infty} \frac{a_n}{\sigma^n},$$
with weights $a_n \in [0,1,2].$

The steps in the sigmary scale resemble the intervals of the mixolydian mode in log scale. Progression to the next octave is paralleled by the carry in 21 and 22.

Sigmary expansions are not unique. Due to the identities
$$\begin{align}
\sigma^{n+1} &=2\sigma^n +\sigma^{n-1} \\
\sigma^{n+1} +\sigma^{n-1} &=2\sigma^n +2\sigma^{n-1},\end{align}$$
digit blocks $21_\sigma \text{ and } 22_\sigma$ carry to the next power of $\sigma,$ resulting in $100_\sigma \text{ and } 101_\sigma.$ The number one has finite and infinite representations $1.0_\sigma, 0.21_\sigma$ and $0.\overline{20}_\sigma, 0.1\overline{2}_\sigma,$ where the first of each pair is in canonical form. The algebraic number $2(3\sigma -7)$ can be written $0.101_\sigma,$ or non-canonically as $0.022_\sigma.$ The decimal number $10 =111.12_\sigma,$ $7\sigma +3 =1100_\sigma \,$ and $\tfrac{1}{\sigma -1} =0.\overline{1}_\sigma.$

Properties of canonical sigmary expansions, with coefficients $a,b,c \in \mathbb{Z}:$

- Every algebraic integer $\xi =a +b\sigma \text{ in } K$ has a finite expansion.
- Every rational number $\rho =\tfrac{a +b\sigma}{c} \text{ in } K$ has a purely periodic expansion.
- All numbers that do not lie in $K$ have chaotic expansions.

Remarkably, the same holds mutatis mutandis for all quadratic Pisot numbers that satisfy the general equation $x^2=nx +1,$ with integer n > 0. It follows by repeated substitution of $x=n +\frac{1}{x}$ that all positive solutions $\tfrac12 \left(n +\sqrt{n^2 + 4 \vphantom{/} } \right)$ have a purely periodic continued fraction expansion
$$\sigma_n =n +\cfrac{1}{n +\cfrac{1}{n +\cfrac{1}{\ddots}}}$$
Vera de Spinadel described the properties of these irrationals and introduced the moniker metallic means.

The silver ratio is related to the central Delannoy numbers $D_n$ = 1, 3, 13, 63, 321, 1683, 8989,... that count the number of "king walks" between one pair of opposite corners of a square n × n lattice. The sequence has generating function
$$\frac{1}{\sqrt{1 -6x +x^2}} =\sum_{n=0}^{\infty} D_n x^n \text{ for } \vert x\vert <\tfrac{1}{\sigma^2},$$
from which are obtained the integral representation
$$D_n =\frac{1}{\pi} \int_{\sigma^{-2}}^{\sigma^2} \frac{\mathrm{d}t}{\sqrt{(t -\sigma^{-2})(\sigma^2 -t)} \;t^{n+1}}$$
and asymptotic formula
$$D_n \sim \frac{\sigma^{2n+1}}{2\sqrt{\pi (\sigma-1) \,n}} \left( 1 -\frac{11 -3\sigma}{32 \,n} +\frac{221 -36\sigma^2}{(32 \,n)^2} +\mathcal{O}\bigl(n^{-3}\bigr) \right).$$

For an application of the sigmary scale, consider the problem of writing a possible third-order coefficient c in terms of the silver ratio. The decimal value of c is approximately 0.006865233, which can be found with the method of dominant balance using the recurrence relation for the central Delannoy numbers, $n \,D_n = (6n -3)D_{n-1} -(n-1)D_{n-2},$ with $D_{-1} =D_0 =1, n_{max} =10^5.$ "The coefficients all lie in $\mathbb{Q}\left( \sqrt{2} \right)$ and have denominators equal to some power of the prime $\sqrt{2} \,\mathbb{Z}[\sigma].$" Choosing denominator d = 32768, the approximate numerator dc has sigmary expansion $1001201.010201012000000110..._\sigma$ and is truncated to a quadratic integer by dropping all digits of order $k <-9.$ Write the remaining powers $\sigma^k$ in linear form with Pell numbers as coefficients (see the following section), take the weighted sum and simplify, giving term $-\frac{4123 -309\sigma^3}{(32 \,n)^3}.$ A certified value for c is however as yet unknown.

== Pell sequences ==
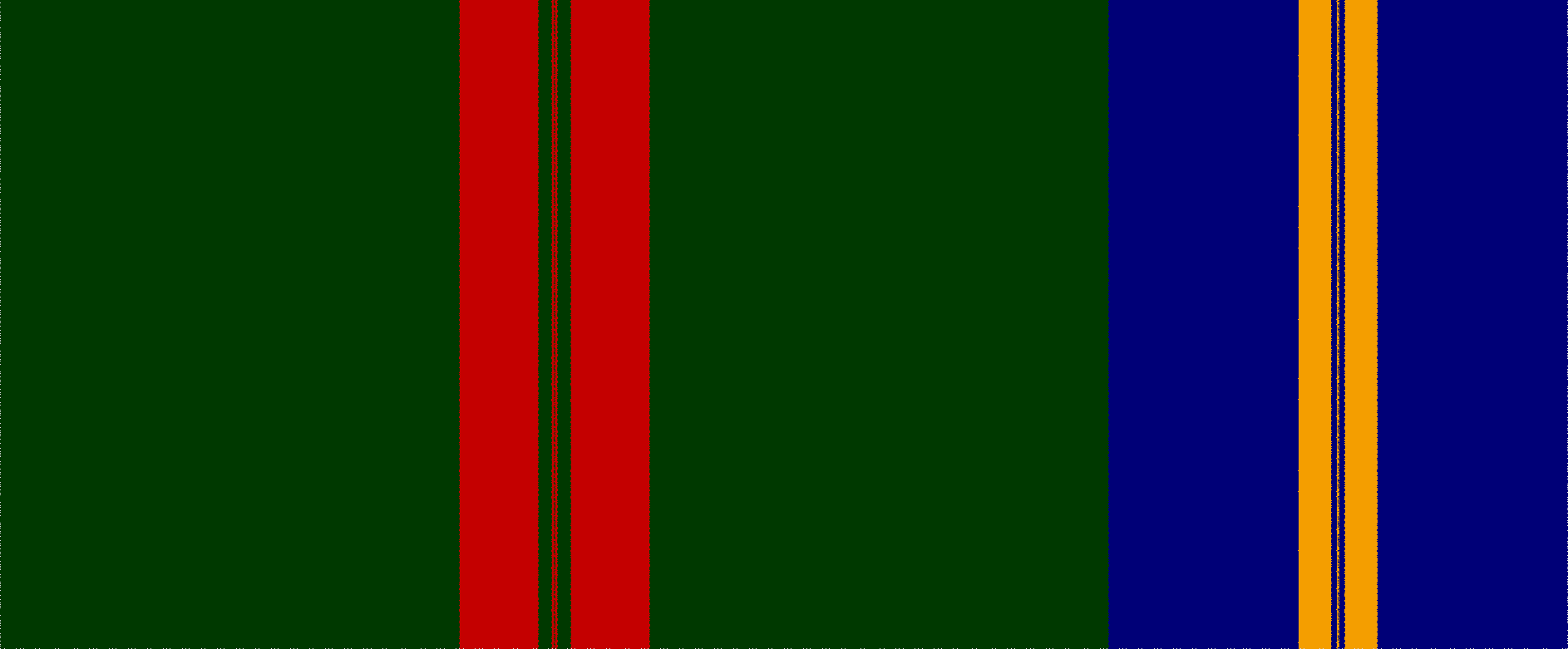
Silver harmonics: the rectangle and its coloured subzones have areas in ratios 7σ + 3 : σ^{3} : σ^{2} : σ : 1.

These numbers are related to the silver ratio as the Fibonacci numbers and Lucas numbers are to the golden ratio.

The fundamental sequence is defined by the recurrence relation
$$P_n =2P_{n-1} +P_{n-2} \text{ for } n > 1,$$
with initial values
$$P_0 =0, P_1 =1.$$

The first few terms are 0, 1, 2, 5, 12, 29, 70, 169,... OEIS: A000129.
The limit ratio of consecutive terms is the silver mean.

Fractions of Pell numbers provide rational approximations of $\sigma$ with error
$$\left\vert \sigma - \frac{P_{n+1}}{P_n} \right\vert < \frac{1}{\sqrt{8} P_n^2}$$

The sequence is extended to negative indices using
$$P_{-n} =(-1)^{n-1} P_n.$$

Powers of $\sigma$ can be written with Pell numbers as linear coefficients
$$\sigma^n =\sigma P_n +P_{n-1},$$
which is proved by mathematical induction on n. The relation also holds for n < 0.

The generating function of the sequence is given by
$$\frac{x}{1 -2x -x^2} =\sum_{n=0}^{\infty} P_n x^n \text{ for } \vert x\vert <\tfrac{1}{\sigma}.$$

Newton's method for p(z) = (z^{2} − 2z − 1)(z^{2} − 2z + σ) / σ: the silver ratio (right) and its conjugate with perturbing complex roots 1 ± i√σ̅ − 1̅ at the nuclei of their basins of attraction. Julia set of the Newton map in orange, with unit circle and real curve for reference.

The characteristic equation of the recurrence is $x^2 -2x -1 =0$ with discriminant $D=8.$ If the two solutions are silver ratio $\sigma$ and conjugate $\bar{\sigma},$ so that $\sigma +\bar{\sigma} =2 \;\text{ and } \;\sigma \cdot \bar{\sigma} =-1,$ the Pell numbers are computed with the Binet formula
$$P_n =a( \sigma^n -\bar{\sigma}^n ),$$
with $a$ the positive root of $8x^2 -1 =0.$

Since $\left\vert a\,\bar{\sigma}^n \right\vert < 1 /\sigma^{2n},$ the number $P_n$ is the nearest integer to $a\,\sigma^n ,$ with $a =1 /\sqrt{8}$ and n ≥ 0.

The Binet formula $\sigma^n +\bar{\sigma}^n$ defines the companion sequence $Q_n =P_{n+1} +P_{n-1}.$

The first few terms are 2, 2, 6, 14, 34, 82, 198,... OEIS: A002203.

This Pell-Lucas sequence has the Fermat property: if p is prime, $Q_{p} \equiv Q_1 \bmod p.$ The converse does not hold, the least odd pseudoprimes $\,n \mid (Q_n -2)$ are 13^{2}, 385, 31^{2}, 1105, 1121, 3827, 4901. (Note: There are 3360 odd composite numbers below 10^{9} that pass the Pell-Lucas test. This compares favourably to the number of odd Fibonacci, Pell, Lucas-Selfridge or base-2 Fermat pseudoprimes.)

Pell numbers are obtained as integral powers n > 2 of a matrix with positive eigenvalue $\sigma$
$$M = \begin{pmatrix} 2 & 1 \\ 1 & 0 \end{pmatrix} ,$$

$$M^n = \begin{pmatrix} P_{n+1} & P_n \\ P_n & P_{n-1} \end{pmatrix}$$

The trace of $M^n$ gives the above $Q_n.$

== Geometry ==
=== Silver rectangle and regular octagon ===
Origami construction of a silver rectangle, with creases in green.

An ISO 216 rectangle has edges with lengths in Lichtenberg ratio √2 ∶ 1. (Note: In 1979 the British Origami Society proposed the alias silver rectangle for the √2 rectangle, which is commonly used now. In this article that name is reserved for the σ rectangle.) It can be created from a square piece of paper with an origami folding sequence. Considered a proportion of great harmony in Japanese aesthetics — Yamato-hi (大和比) — the ratio is retained if the √2 rectangle is folded in half, parallel to the short edges. Rabatment produces a rectangle with edges in the silver ratio (according to 1/σ = √2 − 1).

- Fold a square sheet of paper in half, creating a falling diagonal crease (bisect 90° angle), then unfold.
- Fold the right hand edge onto the diagonal crease (bisect 45° angle).
- Fold the top edge in half, to the back side (reduce width by 1/(σ + 1)), and open out the triangle. The result is a √2 rectangle.
- Fold the bottom edge onto the left hand edge (reduce height by 1/(σ − 1)). The horizontal part on top is a silver rectangle.

If the folding paper is opened out, the creases coincide with diagonal sections of a regular octagon. The first two creases divide the square into a silver gnomon with angles in the ratios 5 : 2 : 1, between two right triangles with angles in ratios 4 : 2 : 2 (left) and 4 : 3 : 1 (right). The unit angle is equal to 22 1/2 degrees.

If the octagon has edge length $1,$ its area is $2\sigma$ and the diagonals have lengths $\sqrt{\sigma +1 \vphantom{/} }, \;\sigma$ and $\sqrt{2(\sigma +1) \vphantom{/} }.$ The coordinates of the vertices are given by the 8 permutations of $\left( \pm \tfrac12, \pm \tfrac{\sigma}{2} \right).$ The paper square has edge length $\sigma -1$ and area $2.$ The triangles have areas $1, \frac{\sigma -1}{\sigma}$ and $\frac{1}{\sigma} ;$ the rectangles have areas $\sigma -1 \text{ and } \frac{1}{\sigma}.$

=== Silver whirl ===
A whirl of silver rectangles.

Divide a rectangle with sides in ratio 1 : 2 into four congruent right triangles with legs of equal length and arrange these in the shape of a silver rectangle, enclosing a similar rectangle that is scaled by factor $\tfrac{1}{\sigma}$ and rotated about the centre by $\tfrac{\pi}{4}.$ Repeating the construction at successively smaller scales results in four infinite sequences of adjoining right triangles, tracing a whirl of converging silver rectangles.

The logarithmic spiral through the vertices of adjacent triangles has polar slope $k =\frac{4}{\pi} \ln( \sigma).$ The parallelogram between the pair of grey triangles on the sides has perpendicular diagonals in ratio $\sigma$, hence is a silver rhombus.

If the triangles have legs of length $1$ then each discrete spiral has length $\frac{\sigma}{\sigma -1} =\sum_{n=0}^{\infty} \sigma^{-n} .$ The areas of the triangles in each spiral region sum to $\frac{\sigma}{4} =\tfrac12 \sum_{n=0}^{\infty} \sigma^{-2n} ;$ the perimeters are equal to $\sigma +2$ (light grey) and $2\sigma -1$ (silver regions).

Arranging the tiles with the four hypotenuses facing inward results in the diamond-in-a-square shape. Roman architect Vitruvius recommended the implied ad quadratura ratio as one of three for proportioning a town house atrium. The scaling factor is $\tfrac{1}{\sigma -1},$ and iteration on edge length 2 gives an angular spiral of length $\sigma +1.$

=== Polyhedra ===
Dimensions of the rhombicuboctahedron are linked to σ.

The silver mean has connections to the following Archimedean solids with octahedral symmetry; all values are based on edge length = 2.

- Rhombicuboctahedron

The coordinates of the vertices are given by 24 distinct permutations of $( \pm \sigma, \pm 1, \pm 1),$ thus three mutually-perpendicular silver rectangles touch six of its square faces.
The midradius is $\sqrt{2(\sigma +1) \vphantom{/} },$ the centre radius for the square faces is $\sigma.$

- Truncated cube

Coordinates: 24 permutations of $( \pm \sigma, \pm \sigma, \pm 1).$
Midradius: $\sigma +1,$ centre radius for the octagon faces: $\sigma.$

- Truncated cuboctahedron

Coordinates: 48 permutations of $( \pm (2\sigma -1), \pm \sigma, \pm 1).$
Midradius: $\sqrt{6(\sigma +1) \vphantom{/} },$ centre radius for the square faces: $\sigma +2,$ for the octagon faces: $2\sigma -1.$

See also the dual Catalan solids

- Tetragonal trisoctahedron
- Trisoctahedron
- Hexakis octahedron

=== Silver triangle ===
Silver triangle and whirling gnomons.

The acute isosceles triangle formed by connecting two adjacent vertices of a regular octagon to its centre point, is here called the silver triangle. It is uniquely identified by its angles in ratios $2 :3 :3.$ The apex angle measures $360 /8=45,$ each base angle $67 \tfrac12$ degrees. It follows that the height to base ratio is $\tfrac12 \tan(67 \tfrac12) =\tfrac{\sigma}{2}.$

By trisecting one of its base angles, the silver triangle is partitioned into a similar triangle and an obtuse silver gnomon. The trisector is collinear with a medium diagonal of the octagon. Sharing the apex of the parent triangle, the gnomon has angles of $67 \tfrac12 /3 =22 \tfrac12, 45 \text{ and } 112 \tfrac12$ degrees in the ratios $1 :2 :5.$ From the law of sines, its edges are in ratios $1 :\sqrt{\sigma +1} :\sigma.$

The similar silver triangle is likewise obtained by scaling the parent triangle in base to leg ratio $2\cos(67 \tfrac12)$, accompanied with an $112 \tfrac12$ degree rotation. Repeating the process at decreasing scales results in an infinite sequence of silver triangles, which converges at the centre of rotation. It is assumed without proof that the centre of rotation is the intersection point of sequential median lines that join corresponding legs and base vertices. The assumption is verified by construction, as demonstrated in the vector image.

The centre of rotation is the first Brocard point of the triangle, with angle $\omega =\arctan (\tfrac{\sigma}{\sigma +2})$ and barycentric coordinates
$$\left( \tfrac{\sigma +1}{\sigma +5} :\tfrac{2}{\sigma +5} :\tfrac{2}{\sigma +5} \right) \sim \left( \tfrac{\sigma +1}{2} :1 :1 \right).$$
The three whorls of stacked gnomons have areas in ratios
$$\left( \tfrac{\sigma +1}{2} \right)^2 :\tfrac{\sigma +1}{2} :1.$$

The logarithmic spiral through the vertices of all nested triangles has polar slope
$$k =\frac{4}{5\pi} \ln \left( \tfrac{\sigma}{\sigma-1} \right),$$
or an expansion rate of $\tfrac{\sigma +1}{2}$ for every $225$ degrees of rotation.

Silver triangle centers: affine coordinates on the axis of symmetry
circumcenter	$\left( \tfrac{2}{\sigma +1} :\tfrac{1}{\sigma} \right) \sim ( \sigma -1 :1)$
centroid	$\left( \tfrac23 :\tfrac13 \right) \sim (2 :1)$
nine-point center	$\left( \tfrac{1}{\sigma -1} :\tfrac{1}{\sigma +1} \right) \sim ( \sigma :1)$
incenter, α = 3π/8	$\left( [ 1 +\cos(\alpha)]^{-1} :[ 1 +\sec(\alpha)]^{-1} \right) \sim ( \sec(\alpha) :1)$
symmedian point	$\left( \tfrac{\sigma +1}{\sigma +2} :\tfrac{1}{\sigma +2} \right) \sim ( \sigma +1 :1)$
orthocenter	$\left( \tfrac{2}{\sigma} :\tfrac{1}{\sigma^2} \right) \sim ( 2\sigma :1)$

The long, medium and short diagonals of the regular octagon concur respectively at the apex, the circumcenter and the orthocenter of a silver triangle.

=== Silver rectangle and silver triangle ===
Powers of σ within a silver rectangle.

Assume a silver rectangle has been constructed as indicated above, with height 1, length $\sigma$ and diagonal length $\sqrt{\sigma^2 +1}$. The triangles on the diagonal have altitudes $1 /\sqrt{1 +\sigma^{-2}}\,;$ each perpendicular foot divides the diagonal in ratio $\sigma^2.$

If an horizontal line is drawn through the intersection point of the diagonal and the internal edge of a rabatment square, the parent silver rectangle and the two scaled copies along the diagonal have areas in the ratios $\sigma^2 :2 :1\,,$ the rectangles opposite the diagonal both have areas equal to $\tfrac{2}{\sigma +1}.$

Relative to vertex A, the coordinates of feet of altitudes U and V are
$$\left( \tfrac{\sigma}{\sigma^2 +1}, \tfrac{1}{\sigma^2 +1} \right) \text{ and } \left( \tfrac{\sigma}{1 +\sigma^{-2}}, \tfrac{1}{1 +\sigma^{-2}} \right).$$

If the diagram is further subdivided by perpendicular lines through U and V, the lengths of the diagonal and its subsections can be expressed as trigonometric functions of argument $\alpha =67 \tfrac12$ degrees, the base angle of the silver triangle:

Diagonal segments of the silver rectangle measure the silver triangle. The ratio AB:AS is σ.

$$\begin{align}
\overline{A B} =\sqrt{\sigma^2 +1} &=\sec(\alpha) \\
\overline{A V} =\sigma^2 /\overline{A B} &=\sigma\sin(\alpha) \\
\overline{U V} =2 /\overline{A S} &=2\sin(\alpha) \\
\overline{S B} =4 /\overline{A B} &=4\cos(\alpha) \\
\overline{S V} =3 /\overline{A B} &=3\cos(\alpha) \\
\overline{A S} =\sqrt{1 +\sigma^{-2}} &=\csc(\alpha) \\
\overline{h} =1 /\overline{A S} &=\sin(\alpha) \\
\overline{U S} =\overline{A V} -\overline{S B} &=(2\sigma -3)\cos(\alpha) \\
\overline{A U} =1 /\overline{A B} &=\cos(\alpha),\end{align}$$

with $\sigma =\tan(\alpha).$

Both the lengths of the diagonal sections and the trigonometric values are elements of biquadratic number field $K =\mathbb{Q}\left( \sqrt{2 +\sqrt{2}} \right).$

The silver rhombus with edge $1$ has diagonal lengths equal to $\overline{U V}$ and $2\overline{A U}.$ The regular octagon with edge $2$ has long diagonals of length $2\overline{A B}$ that divide it into eight silver triangles. Since the regular octagon is defined by its side length and the angles of the silver triangle, it follows that all measures can be expressed in powers of σ and the diagonal segments of the silver rectangle, as illustrated above, pars pro toto on a single triangle.

The leg to base ratio $\overline{A B} /2 \approx 1.306563$ has been dubbed the Cordovan proportion by Spanish architect Rafael de la Hoz Arderius. According to his observations, it is a notable measure in the architecture and intricate decorations of the mediæval Mosque of Córdoba, Andalusia.

=== Silver spiral ===
Silver spirals with different initial angles on a σ− rectangle.

A silver spiral is a logarithmic spiral that gets wider by a factor of $\sigma$ for every quarter turn. It is described by the polar equation $r( \theta) =a \exp(k \theta),$ with initial radius $a$ and parameter $k =\frac{2}{\pi} \ln( \sigma).$ If drawn on a silver rectangle, the spiral has its pole at the foot of altitude of a triangle on the diagonal and passes through vertices of paired squares which are perpendicularly aligned and successively scaled by a factor $\sigma^{-1}.$

=== Ammann–Beenker tiling ===
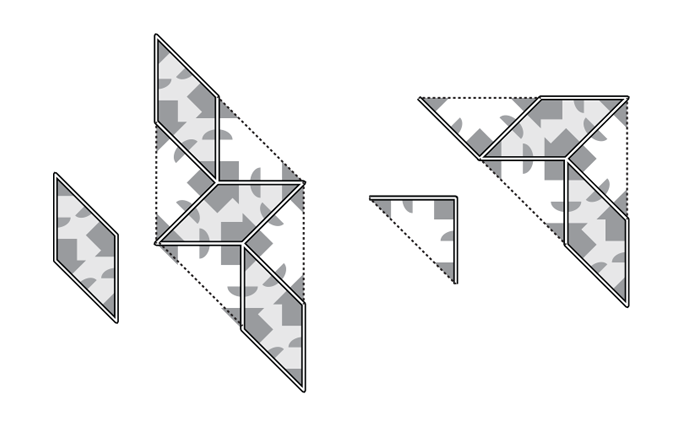
Patch inflation of Ammann A5-tiles with factor σ^{2}.

The silver ratio appears prominently in the Ammann–Beenker tiling, a non-periodic tiling of the plane with octagonal symmetry, build from a square and silver rhombus with equal side lengths. Discovered by Robert Ammann in 1977, its algebraic properties were described by Frans Beenker five years later. If the squares are cut into two triangles, the inflation factor for Ammann A5-tiles is $\sigma^2,$ the dominant eigenvalue of substitution matrix
$$M =\begin{pmatrix} 3 & 2 \\ 4 & 3 \end{pmatrix}.$$

== See also ==
- Solutions of equations similar to $x^2 =2x +1$:
  - Golden ratio – the positive solution of the equation $x^2 =x +1$
  - Metallic means – positive solutions of the general equation $x^2 =nx +1$
  - Supersilver ratio – the real solution of the equation $x^3 =2x^2 +1$
