= Metallic mean =

Generalization of golden and silver ratios

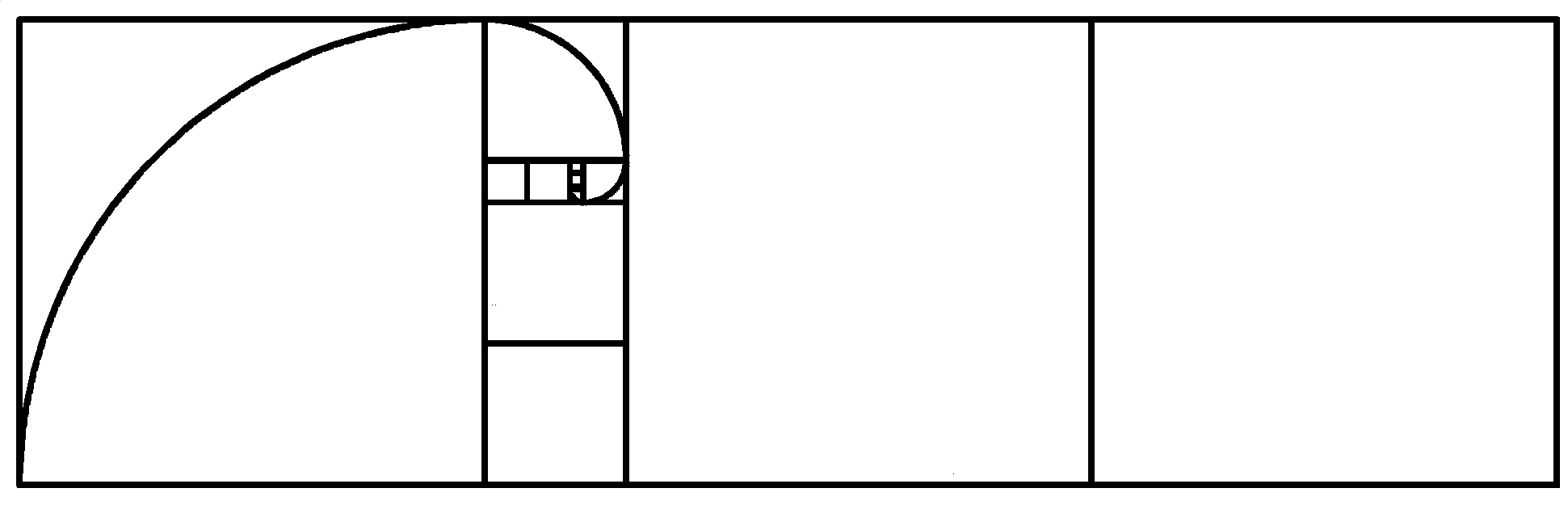
Gold, silver, and bronze ratios within their respective rectangles.

The metallic mean (also metallic ratio, metallic constant, or noble mean) of a natural number n is a positive real number, denoted here $S_n,$ that satisfies the following equivalent characterizations:

- the unique positive real number $x$ such that $x=n+\frac 1x$
- the positive root of the quadratic equation $x^2-nx-1=0$
- the number $\frac{n+\sqrt{n^2+4}}2 = \frac2{\sqrt{n^2+4}-n}$
- the number whose expression as a continued fraction is
  $$[n;n,n,n,n,\dots] = n + \cfrac{1}{n+\cfrac{1} {n+\cfrac{1} {n+\cfrac{1} {n+\ddots\,}}}}$$

Metallic means are (successive) derivations of the golden ($n=1$) and silver ratios ($n=2$), and share some of their interesting properties. The term "bronze ratio" ($n=3$) (cf. Golden Age and Olympic Medals) and even metals such as copper ($n=4$) and nickel ($n=5$) are occasionally found in the literature. (Note: This name appears to have originated from de Spinadel's paper.)

In terms of algebraic number theory, the metallic means are exactly the real quadratic integers that are greater than $1$ and have $-1$ as their norm.

The defining equation $x^2-nx-1=0$ of the nth metallic mean is the characteristic equation of a linear recurrence relation of the form $x_k=nx_{k-1}+x_{k-2}.$ It follows that, given such a recurrence the solution can be expressed as

$$x_k=aS_n^k+b\left(\frac{-1}{S_n}\right)^k,$$

where $S_n$ is the nth metallic mean, and a and b are constants depending only on $x_0$ and $x_1.$ Since the inverse of a metallic mean is less than 1, this formula implies that the quotient of two consecutive elements of such a sequence tends to the metallic mean, when k tends to the infinity.

For example, if $n=1,$ $S_n$ is the golden ratio. If $x_0=0$ and $x_1=1,$ the sequence is the Fibonacci sequence, and the above formula is Binet's formula. If $n=1, x_0=2, x_1=1$ one has the Lucas numbers. If $n=2,$ the metallic mean is called the silver ratio, and the elements of the sequence starting with $x_0=0$ and $x_1=1$ are called the Pell numbers.

== Geometry ==
If one removes n largest possible squares from a rectangle with ratio length/width equal to the nth metallic mean, one gets a rectangle with the same ratio length/width (in the figures, n is the number of dotted lines).

Golden ratio within the pentagram (φ = red/ green = green/blue = blue/purple) and silver ratio within the octagon.

The defining equation $x=n+\frac 1x$ of the nth metallic mean induces the following geometrical interpretation.

Consider a rectangle such that the ratio of its length L to its width W is the nth metallic ratio. If one remove from this rectangle n squares of side length W, one gets a rectangle similar to the original rectangle; that is, a rectangle with the same ratio of the length to the width (see figures).

Some metallic means appear as segments in the figure formed by a regular polygon and its diagonals. This is in particular the case for the golden ratio and the pentagon, and for the silver ratio and the octagon; see figures.

== Powers ==
Denoting by $S_m$ the metallic mean of m one has

$$S_{m}^n = K_n S_m + K_{n-1} ,$$

where the numbers $K_n$ are defined recursively by the initial conditions K_{0} = 0 and K_{1} = 1, and the recurrence relation

$$K_n = mK_{n-1} + K_{n-2}.$$

Proof: The equality is immediately true for $n=1.$ The recurrence relation implies $K_2=m,$ which makes the equality true for $k=2.$ Supposing the equality true up to $n-1,$ one has

$$\begin{align}
S_m^n & = mS_m^{n-1}+S_m^{n-2} &&\text {(defining equation)}\\
& = m(K_{n-1}S_n + K_{n-2})+ (K_{n-2}S_m+K_{n-3}) &&\text{(recurrence hypothesis)}\\
& = (mK_{n-1}+K_{n-2})S_n +(mK_{n-2}+K_{n-3}) &&\text{(regrouping)}\\
& = K_nS_m+K_{n-1} &&\text{(recurrence on }K_n).
\end{align}$$

End of the proof.

One has also

$$K_n = \frac{S_m^{n+1} - (m-S_m)^{n+1}}{\sqrt{m^2 + 4}} .$$

The odd powers of a metallic mean are themselves metallic means. More precisely, if n is an odd natural number, then $S_m^n=S_{M_n},$ where $M_n$ is defined by the recurrence relation $M_n=mM_{n-1}+M_{n-2}$ and the initial conditions $M_0=2$ and $M_1=m.$

Proof: Let $a=S_m$ and $b=-1/S_m.$ The definition of metallic means implies that $a+b=m$ and $ab=-1.$ Let $M_n=a^n+b^n.$ Since $a^nb^n =(ab)^n=-1$ if n is odd, the power $a^n$ is a root of $x^2- M_n-1=0.$ So, it remains to prove that $M_n$ is an integer that satisfies the given recurrence relation. This results from the identity

$$\begin{align}a^n+b^n &= (a+b)(a^{n-1}+b^{n-1})-ab(a^{n-2}+a^{n-2})\\
&= m(a^{n-1}+b^{n-1})+(a^{n-2}+a^{n-2}).
\end{align}$$

This completes the proof, given that the initial values are easy to verify.

In particular, one has

$$\begin{align}
S_m^3 &= S_{m^3 + 3m} \\
S_m^5 &= S_{m^5 + 5m^3 + 5m} \\
S_m^7 &= S_{m^7 + 7m^5 + 14m^3 + 7m} \\
S_m^9 &= S_{m^9 + 9m^7 + 27m^5 + 30m^3 + 9m} \\
S_m^{11} &= S_{m^{11} + 11m^9 + 44m^7 + 77m^5 + 55m^3 + 11m}
\end{align}$$

and, in general,

$$S_m^{2n+1} = S_M,$$

where

$$M=\sum_{k=0}^n {{2n+1} \over {2k+1}} {{n+k} \choose {2k}} m^{2k+1}.$$

For even powers, things are more complicated. If n is a positive even integer then

$${S_m^n - \left\lfloor S_m^n \right\rfloor} = 1 - S_m^{-n}.$$

Additionally,

$${1 \over {S_m^4 - \left\lfloor S_m^4 \right\rfloor}} + \left\lfloor S_m^4 - 1 \right\rfloor = S_{\left(m^4 + 4m^2 + 1\right)}$$
$${1 \over {S_m^6 - \left\lfloor S_m^6 \right\rfloor }} + \left\lfloor S_m^6 - 1 \right\rfloor = S_{\left(m^6 + 6m^4 + 9m^2 +1\right)}.$$

For the square of a metallic ratio we have:$S_m^2=[m\sqrt{m^2+4}+(m+2)]/2=(p+\sqrt{p^2+4})/2$

where $p=m\sqrt{m^2+4}$ lies strictly between $m^2+1$ and $m^2+2$. Therefore

$S_{m^2+1}<S_m^2<S_{m^2+2}$

== Generalization ==
One may define the metallic mean $S_{-n}$ of a negative integer −n as the positive solution of the equation $x^2-(-n)x-1.$ The metallic mean of −n is the multiplicative inverse of the metallic mean of n:

$$S_{-n}=\frac{1}{S_n}.$$

Another generalization consists of changing the defining equation from $x^2-nx-1 =0$ to $x^2-nx-c =0$. If

$$R=\frac{n\pm\sqrt{n^2+4c}}{2},$$

is any root of the equation, one has

$$R - n= \frac{c}{R}.$$

The silver mean of m is also given by the integral

$$S_m = \int_0^m {\left( {x \over {2\sqrt{x^2+4}}} + {{m+2} \over {2m}} \right)} \, dx.$$

Another form of the metallic mean is

$$\frac{n+\sqrt{n^2+4}}{2} = e^{\operatorname{arsinh(n/2)}}.$$

== Relation to half-angle cotangent ==
A tangent half-angle formula gives
$$\cot\theta = \frac{\cot^2\frac\theta2 - 1}{2\cot\frac\theta2}$$
which can be rewritten as
$$\cot^2\frac\theta2 - (2\cot\theta) \cot\frac\theta2 - 1 = 0\,.$$
That is, for the positive value of $\cot\frac\theta2$, the metallic mean
$$S_{2\cot\theta} = \cot\frac\theta2\,,$$
which is especially meaningful when $2\cot\theta$ is a positive integer, as it is with some Pythagorean triangles.

== Relation to Pythagorean triples ==
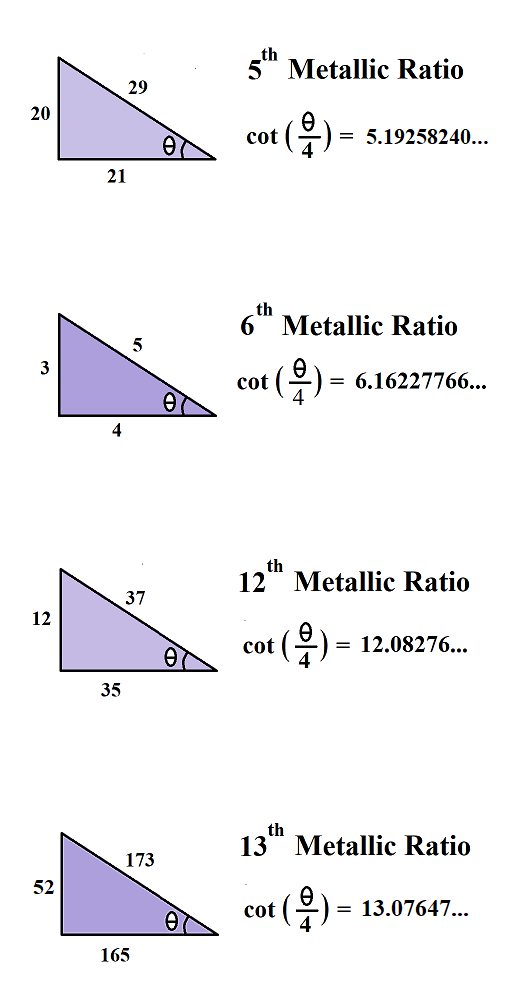
Metallic ratios in primitive Pythagorean triangles

For a primitive Pythagorean triple, a^{2} + b^{2} = c^{2}, with positive integers a < b < c that are relatively prime, if the difference between the hypotenuse c and longer leg b is 1, 2 or 8 then the Pythagorean triangle exhibits a metallic mean. Specifically, the cotangent of one quarter of the smaller acute angle of the Pythagorean triangle is a metallic mean.

More precisely, for a primitive Pythagorean triple (a, b, c) with a < b < c, the smaller acute angle α satisfies
$$\tan \frac{\alpha}{2} = \frac{c-b}{a}\,.$$
When c − b ∈ {1, 2, 8}, we will always get that
$$n=2\cot\frac\alpha2 = \frac{2a}{c-b}$$
is an integer and that
$$\cot\frac\alpha4 = S_n\,,$$
the n-th metallic mean.

The reverse direction also works. For n ≥ 5, the primitive Pythagorean triple that gives the n-th metallic mean is given by (n, n^{2}/4 − 1, n^{2}/4 + 1) if n is a multiple of 4, is given by (n/2, (n^{2} − 4)/8, (n^{2} + 4)/8) if n is even but not a multiple of 4, and is given by (4n, n^{2} − 4, n^{2} + 4) if n is odd. For example, the primitive Pythagorean triple (20, 21, 29) gives the 5th metallic mean; (3, 4, 5) gives the 6th metallic mean; (28, 45, 53) gives the 7th metallic mean; (8, 15, 17) gives the 8th metallic mean; and so on.

== Numerical values ==
First metallic means
n	Ratio	Value	Name
$n$	$\frac{n + \sqrt{4 + n^2}}{2} = \frac{n}{2} + \sqrt{1 + \left(\frac{n}{2}\right)^2}$		
0	$\frac{0 + \sqrt{4}}{2} = 0 + \sqrt{1}$	1	
1	$\frac{1 + \sqrt{5}}{2}$	1.618033988...	Golden
2	$\frac{2 + \sqrt{8}}{2} = 1 + \sqrt{2}$	2.414213562...	Silver
3	$\frac{3 + \sqrt{13}}{2}$	3.302775637...	Bronze
4	$\frac{4 + \sqrt{20}}{2} = 2 + \sqrt{5}$	4.236067977...	
5	$\frac{5 + \sqrt{29}}{2}$	5.192582403...	
6	$\frac{6 + \sqrt{40}}{2} = 3 + \sqrt{10}$	6.162277660...	
7	$\frac{7 + \sqrt{53}}{2}$	7.140054944...	
8	$\frac{8 + \sqrt{68}}{2} = 4 + \sqrt{17}$	8.123105625...	
9	$\frac{9 + \sqrt{85}}{2}$	9.109772228...	
10	$\frac{10 + \sqrt{104}}{2} = 5 + \sqrt{26}$	10.099019513...	

== Relation to Aperiodic Order ==
The $k$-th metallic mean serves as the inflation ratio for one-dimensional substitution tilings, such as $a \to a^k b$ and $b \to a$. These sequences exhibit long-range aperiodic order. By applying an interval removal process to these tilings, one can construct self-similar Cantor sets where the Hausdorff dimension is determined by the metallic mean scaling factor.

== See also ==
- Constant
- Mean
- Ratio
- Plastic ratio
