= Feller's coin-tossing constants =

Mathematical constants

Feller's coin-tossing constants are a set of numerical constants which describe asymptotic probabilities that in n independent tosses of a fair coin, no run of k consecutive heads (or, equally, tails) appears.

William Feller showed that if this probability is written as p(n,k) then

$$\lim_{n\rightarrow \infty} p(n,k) \alpha_k^{n+1}=\beta_k$$

where α_{k} is the smallest positive real root of

$$x^{k+1}=2^{k+1}(x-1)$$

and

$$\beta_k={2-\alpha_k \over k+1-k\alpha_k}.$$

== Values of the constants ==
| k | $\alpha_k$ | $\beta_k$ |
|---|---|---|
| 1 | 2 | 2 |
| 2 | 1.23606797... | 1.44721359... |
| 3 | 1.08737802... | 1.23683983... |
| 4 | 1.03758012... | 1.13268577... |

For $k=2$ the constants are related to the golden ratio, $\varphi$, and Fibonacci numbers; the constants are $\sqrt{5}-1=2\varphi-2=2/\varphi$ and $1+1/\sqrt{5}$. The exact probability p(n,2) can be calculated either by using Fibonacci numbers, p(n,2) = $\tfrac{F_{n+2}}{2^n}$ or by solving a direct recurrence relation leading to the same result. For higher values of $k$, the constants are related to generalizations of Fibonacci numbers such as the tribonacci and tetranacci numbers. The corresponding exact probabilities can be calculated as p(n,k) = $\tfrac{F^{(k)}_{n+2}}{2^n}$.

== Example ==
If we toss a fair coin ten times then the exact probability that no pair of heads come up in succession (i.e. n = 10 and k = 2) is p(10,2) = $\tfrac{9}{64}$ = 0.140625. The approximation $p(n,k) \approx \beta_k / \alpha_k^{n+1}$ gives 1.44721356...×1.23606797...^{−11} = 0.1406263...
