= Rabatment of the rectangle =

Cutting a square from a rectangle

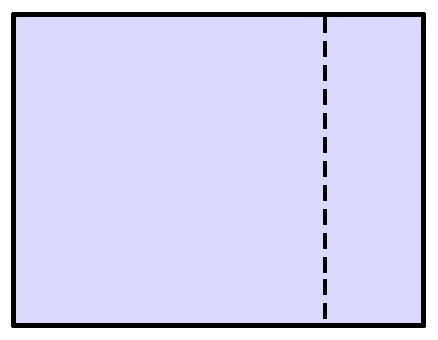
The dotted line represents one of two possible rabatments of the rectangle

Rabatment of the rectangle is a compositional technique used as an aid for the placement of objects or the division of space within a rectangular frame, or as an aid for the study of art.

Every rectangle contains two implied squares, each consisting of a short side of the rectangle, an equal length along each longer side, and an imaginary fourth line parallel to the short side. The process of mentally rotating the short sides onto the long ones is called "rabatment", and often the imaginary fourth line is called "the rabatment".

== Theory ==
There is no absolute explanation of the mechanism of this method, but there are various theories. One argument is that squares are such a simple, primal geometric shape that the brain automatically looks for them, mentally completing this rabatment whether it is made explicit or not. When a composition uses elements of the scene to match, the square feels complete in itself, producing a feeling of harmony.

== Practice ==
Animation of a rabatment line within a rectangle

Renaissance artists used rabatment as a foundation to art and architectural works, but the rabatment can be observed in art taken from almost any period.

As one of many composition techniques, rabatment of the rectangle can be used to inform the positioning of elements within the rectangle. There is no hard and fast rule regarding such positioning; a composition can have a sense of dynamic unrest or a sense of equilibrium relative to important lines such as ones taken from rabatment or from the rule of thirds, or from nodal points such as the "eyes of a rectangle"—the four intersections derived from the rule of thirds. Primary image elements can be positioned within one of the two rabatment squares to define the center of interest, and secondary image elements can be placed outside of a rabatment square.

The concept of rabatment can be applied to rectangles of any proportion. For rectangles with a 3:2 ratio (as in 35mm film in still photography), it happens that the rabatment lines are exactly matched to the rule of thirds lines.

In a horizontally-aligned rectangle, there is one implied square for the left side and one for the right; for a vertically-aligned rectangle, there are upper and lower squares. If the long sides of the rectangle are exactly twice the length of the short, this line is right in the middle. With longer-proportioned rectangles, the squares don't overlap, but with shorter-proportioned ones, they do. In Western cultures that read left to right, attention is often focused inside the left-hand rabatment, or on the line it forms at the right-hand side of the image.

When rabatment is used with one side of a golden rectangle, and then iteratively applied to the left-over rectangle, the resulting "whirling rectangles" describe the golden spiral.

== Examples ==
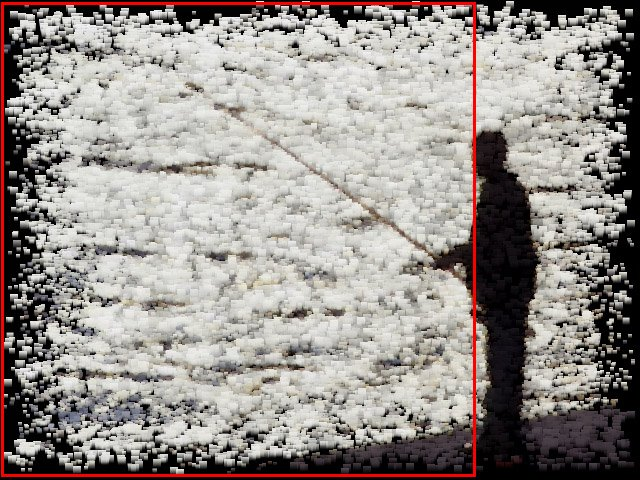

This computer art image has the fisherman positioned facing into the left-hand rabatment square.

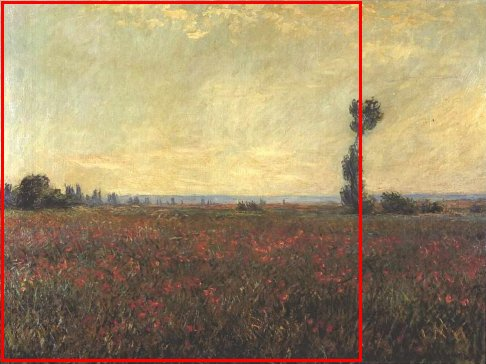

Claude Monet's painting of a poppyfield includes one tall tree at the rightmost border of the left-hand rabatment square.

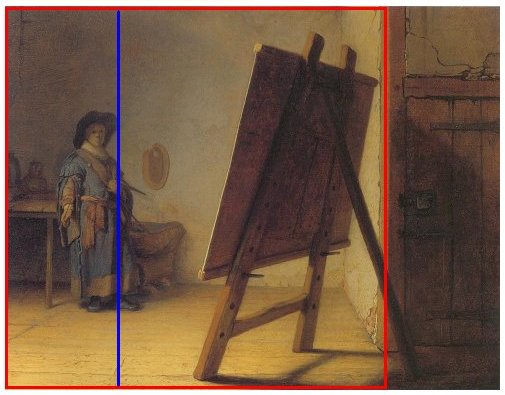

Rembrandt's self-portrait places the lit part of his studio within the left-hand rabatment square. The artist himself stands at the border of the other square facing inward.

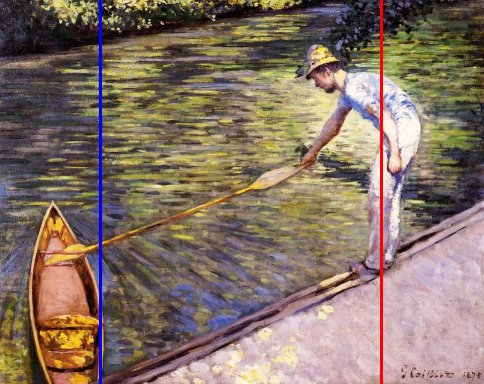

Gustave Caillebotte's painting shows the boat outside the right-hand rabatment square and the man at the rightmost border of the left-hand square, leaning and reaching across the empty central expanse. Both the upper and the lower river banks intersect the rabatment lines at the painting's border.
