= Characteristic equation (calculus) =

Algebraic equation on which the solution of a differential equation depends

In mathematics, the characteristic equation (or auxiliary equation) is an algebraic equation of degree n upon which depends the solution of a given nth-order differential equation or difference equation. The characteristic equation can only be formed when the differential equation is linear and homogeneous, and has constant coefficients. Such a differential equation, with y as the dependent variable, superscript (n) denoting n^{th}-derivative, and a_{n}, a_{n − 1}, ..., a_{1}, a_{0} as constants,

$$a_{n}y^{(n)} + a_{n-1}y^{(n-1)} + \cdots + a_{1}y' + a_{0}y = 0,$$

will have a characteristic equation of the form

$$a_{n}r^{n} + a_{n-1}r^{n-1} + \cdots + a_{1}r + a_{0} = 0$$

whose solutions r_{1}, r_{2}, ..., r_{n} are the roots from which the general solution can be formed. Analogously, a linear difference equation of the form

$$y_{t+n} = b_1y_{t+n-1} + \cdots + b_ny_{t}$$

has characteristic equation

$$r^n - b_1r^{n-1} - \cdots - b_n =0,$$

discussed in more detail at Linear recurrence with constant coefficients.

The characteristic roots (roots of the characteristic equation) also provide qualitative information about the behavior of the variable whose evolution is described by the dynamic equation. For a differential equation parameterized on time, the variable's evolution is stable if and only if the real part of each root is negative. For difference equations, there is stability if and only if the modulus of each root is less than 1. For both types of equation, persistent fluctuations occur if there is at least one pair of complex roots.

The method of integrating linear ordinary differential equations with constant coefficients was discovered by Leonhard Euler, who found that the solutions depended on an algebraic 'characteristic' equation. The qualities of the Euler's characteristic equation were later considered in greater detail by French mathematicians Augustin-Louis Cauchy and Gaspard Monge.

== Derivation ==
Starting with a linear homogeneous differential equation with constant coefficients a_{n}, a_{n − 1}, ..., a_{1}, a_{0},

$$a_n y^{(n)} + a_{n-1}y^{(n-1)} + \cdots + a_1 y^\prime + a_0 y = 0,$$

it can be seen that if y(x) = e^{rx}, each term would be a constant multiple of e^{rx}. This results from the fact that the derivative of the exponential function e^{rx} is a multiple of itself. Therefore, y′ = re^{rx}, y″ = r^{2}e^{rx}, and y^{(n)} = r^{n}e^{rx} are all multiples. This suggests that certain values of r will allow multiples of e^{rx} to sum to zero, thus solving the homogeneous differential equation. In order to solve for r, one can substitute y = e^{rx} and its derivatives into the differential equation to get

$$a_n r^n e^{rx} + a_{n-1}r^{n-1}e^{rx} + \cdots + a_1 re^{rx} + a_0 e^{rx} = 0$$

Since e^{rx} can never equal zero, it can be divided out, giving the characteristic equation

$$a_n r^n + a_{n-1}r^{n-1} + \cdots + a_1 r + a_0 = 0.$$

By solving for the roots, r, in this characteristic equation, one can find the general solution to the differential equation. For example, if r has roots equal to 3, 11, and 40, then the general solution will be $y(x) = c_1 e^{3 x} + c_2 e^{11 x} + c_3 e^{40 x}$, where $c_1$, $c_2$, and $c_3$ are arbitrary constants which need to be determined by the boundary and/or initial conditions.

== Formation of the general solution ==
Solving the characteristic equation for its roots, r_{1}, ..., r_{n}, allows one to find the general solution of the differential equation. The roots may be real or complex, as well as distinct or repeated. If a characteristic equation has parts with distinct real roots, h repeated roots, or k complex roots corresponding to general solutions of y_{D}(x), y_{R_{1}}(x), ..., y_{R_{h}}(x), and y_{C_{1}}(x), ..., y_{C_{k}}(x), respectively, then the general solution to the differential equation is

$$y(x) = y_\mathrm{D}(x) + y_{\mathrm{R}_1}(x) + \cdots + y_{\mathrm{R}_h}(x) + y_{\mathrm{C}_1}(x) + \cdots + y_{\mathrm{C}_k}(x)$$

=== Example ===
The linear homogeneous differential equation with constant coefficients

$$y^{(5)} + y^{(4)} - 4y^{(3)} - 16y'' -20y' - 12y = 0$$

has the characteristic equation

$$r^5 + r^4 - 4r^3 - 16r^2 -20r - 12 = 0$$

By factoring the characteristic equation into

$$(r - 3)(r^2 + 2r + 2)^2 = 0$$

one can see that the solutions for r are the distinct single root r_{1} = 3 and the double complex roots r_{2,3,4,5} = 1 ± i. This corresponds to the real-valued general solution

$$y(x) = c_1 e^{3x} + e^x(c_2 \cos x + c_3 \sin x) + xe^x(c_4 \cos x + c_5 \sin x)$$

with constants c_{1}, ..., c_{5}.

=== Distinct real roots ===
The superposition principle for linear homogeneous says that if u_{1}, ..., u_{n} are n linearly independent solutions to a particular differential equation, then c_{1}u_{1} + ⋯ + c_{n}u_{n} is also a solution for all values c_{1}, ..., c_{n}. Therefore, if the characteristic equation has distinct real roots r_{1}, ..., r_{n}, then a general solution will be of the form

$$y_\mathrm{D}(x) = c_1 e^{r_1 x} + c_2 e^{r_2 x} + \cdots + c_n e^{r_n x}$$

=== Repeated real roots ===
If the characteristic equation has a root r_{1} that is repeated k times, then it is clear that y_{p}(x) = c_{1}e^{r_{1}x} is at least one solution. However, this solution lacks linearly independent solutions from the other k − 1 roots. Since r_{1} has multiplicity k, the differential equation can be factored into

$$\left ( \frac{d}{dx} - r_1 \right )^k y = 0 .$$

The fact that y_{p}(x) = c_{1}e^{r_{1}x} is one solution allows one to presume that the general solution may be of the form y(x) = u(x)e^{r_{1}x}, where u(x) is a function to be determined. Substituting ue^{r_{1}x} gives

$$\left( \frac{d}{dx} - r_1 \right)\! ue^{r_1 x} = \frac{d}{dx}\left(ue^{r_1 x}\right) - r_1 ue^{r_1 x} = \frac{d}{dx}(u)e^{r_1 x} + r_1 ue^{r_1 x}- r_1 ue^{r_1 x} = \frac{d}{dx}(u)e^{r_1 x}$$

when k = 1. By applying this fact k times, it follows that

$$\left( \frac{d}{dx} - r_1 \right)^k ue^{r_1 x} = \frac{d^k}{dx^k}(u)e^{r_1 x} = 0.$$

By dividing out e^{r_{1}x}, it can be seen that

$$\frac{d^k}{dx^k}(u) = u^{(k)} = 0.$$

Therefore, the general case for u(x) is a polynomial of degree k − 1, so that u(x) = c_{1} + c_{2}x + c_{3}x^{2} + ⋯ + c_{k}x^{k −1}. Since y(x) = ue^{r_{1}x}, the part of the general solution corresponding to r_{1} is

$$y_\mathrm{R}(x) = e^{r_1 x}\!\left(c_1 + c_2 x + \cdots + c_k x^{k-1}\right).$$

=== Complex roots ===
If a second-order differential equation has a characteristic equation with complex conjugate roots of the form r_{1} = a + bi and r_{2} = a − bi, then the general solution is accordingly y(x) = c_{1}e^{(a + bi )x} + c_{2}e^{(a − bi )x}. By Euler's formula, which states that e^{iθ} = cos(θ) + i sin(θ), this solution can be rewritten as follows:

$$\begin{align}
y(x) &= c_{1}e^{(a + bi)x} + c_{2}e^{(a - bi)x}\\
&= c_{1}e^{ax}(\cos bx + i \sin bx) + c_{2}e^{ax}( \cos bx - i \sin bx ) \\
&= \left(c_{1} + c_{2}\right)e^{ax} \cos bx + i(c_{1} - c_{2})e^{ax} \sin bx
\end{align}$$

where c_{1} and c_{2} are constants that can be non-real and which depend on the initial conditions. (Indeed, since y(x) is real, c_{1} − c_{2} must be imaginary or zero and c_{1} + c_{2} must be real, in order for both terms after the last equals sign to be real.)

For example, if c_{1} = c_{2} = 1/2, then the particular solution y_{1}(x) = e^{ax} cos(bx) is formed. Similarly, if c_{1} = 1/2i and c_{2} = −1/2i, then the independent solution formed is y_{2}(x) = e^{ax} sin(bx). Thus by the superposition principle for linear homogeneous differential equations, a second-order differential equation having complex roots r = a ± bi will result in the following general solution:

$$y_\mathrm{C}(x) = e^{ax}(C_1 \cos bx + C_2 \sin bx)$$

This analysis also applies to the parts of the solutions of a higher-order differential equation whose characteristic equation involves non-real complex conjugate roots.

== See also ==
- Characteristic polynomial
