= Pell number =

Number used to approximate the square root of 2

The sides of the squares used to construct a silver spiral are the Pell numbers

In mathematics, the Pell numbers are an infinite sequence of integers, known since ancient times, that comprise the denominators of the closest rational approximations to the square root of 2. This sequence of approximations begins 1/1, 3/2, 7/5, 17/12, and 41/29, so the sequence of Pell numbers begins with 1, 2, 5, 12, and 29. The numerators of the same sequence of approximations are half the companion Pell numbers or Pell–Lucas numbers; these numbers form a second infinite sequence that begins with 2, 6, 14, 34, and 82.

Both the Pell numbers and the companion Pell numbers may be calculated by means of a recurrence relation similar to that for the Fibonacci numbers, and both sequences of numbers grow exponentially, proportionally to powers of the silver ratio 1 + √2. As well as being used to approximate the square root of two, Pell numbers can be used to find square triangular numbers, to construct integer approximations to the right isosceles triangle, and to solve certain combinatorial enumeration problems.

As with Pell's equation, the name of the Pell numbers stems from Leonhard Euler's mistaken attribution of the equation and the numbers derived from it to John Pell. The Pell–Lucas numbers are also named after Édouard Lucas, who studied sequences defined by recurrences of this type; the Pell and companion Pell numbers are Lucas sequences.

== Pell numbers ==
The Pell numbers are defined by the recurrence relation:

$$P_n=\begin{cases}0&\mbox{if }n=0;\\1&\mbox{if }n=1;\\2P_{n-1}+P_{n-2}&\mbox{otherwise.}\end{cases}$$

In words, the sequence of Pell numbers starts with 0 and 1, and then each Pell number is the sum of twice the previous Pell number, plus the Pell number before that. The first few terms of the sequence are

0, 1, 2, 5, 12, 29, 70, 169, 408, 985, 2378, 5741, 13860, … (sequence A000129 in the OEIS).

Analogously to the Binet formula, the Pell numbers can also be expressed by the closed form formula

$$P_n=\frac{\left(1+\sqrt2\right)^n-\left(1-\sqrt2\right)^n}{2\sqrt2}.$$

For large values of n, the (1 + √2)^{n} term dominates this expression, so the Pell numbers are approximately proportional to powers of the silver ratio 1 + √2, analogous to the growth rate of Fibonacci numbers as powers of the golden ratio.

A third definition is possible, from the matrix formula

$$\begin{pmatrix} P_{n+1} & P_n \\ P_n & P_{n-1} \end{pmatrix} = \begin{pmatrix} 2 & 1 \\ 1 & 0 \end{pmatrix}^n.$$

Many identities can be derived or proven from these definitions; for instance an identity analogous to Cassini's identity for Fibonacci numbers,

$$P_{n+1}P_{n-1}-P_n^2 = (-1)^n,$$

is an immediate consequence of the matrix formula (found by considering the determinants of the matrices on the left and right sides of the matrix formula).

== Approximation to the square root of two ==
Rational approximations to regular octagons, with coordinates derived from the Pell numbers.

Pell numbers arise historically and most notably in the rational approximation to $\sqrt2$. If two large integers x and y form a solution to the Pell equation

$$x^2-2y^2=\pm 1,$$

then their ratio $x/y$ provides a close approximation to $\sqrt2$. The sequence of approximations of this form is

$$\frac11, \frac32, \frac75, \frac{17}{12}, \frac{41}{29}, \frac{99}{70}, \dots$$

where the denominator of each fraction is a Pell number and the numerator is the sum of a Pell number and its predecessor in the sequence. That is, the solutions have the form

$$\frac{P_{n-1}+P_n}{P_n}.$$

The approximation

$$\sqrt 2\approx\frac{577}{408}$$

of this type was known to Indian mathematicians in the third or fourth century BCE. The Greek mathematicians of the fifth century BCE also knew of this sequence of approximations: Plato refers to the numerators as rational diameters. In the second century CE Theon of Smyrna used the term the side and diameter numbers to describe the denominators and numerators of this sequence.

These approximations can be derived from the continued fraction expansion of $\sqrt 2$:

$$\sqrt2 = [1; 2, 2, 2, \ldots{}] = 1 + \cfrac 1 {2 + \cfrac 1 {2 + \cfrac 1 {2 + {{\vphantom x} \atop \displaystyle\ddots}}}}.$$

Truncating this expansion to any number of terms produces one of the Pell-number-based approximations in this sequence; for instance, with seven $2$s,

$$[1; 2, 2, 2, 2, 2, 2, 2] = \frac{577}{408}.$$

As Knuth (1994) describes, the fact that Pell numbers approximate $\sqrt2$ allows them to be used for accurate rational approximations to a regular octagon with vertex coordinates (±P_{i}, ±P_{i+1}) and (±P_{i+1}, ±P_{i}). All vertices are equally distant from the origin, and form nearly uniform angles around the origin. Alternatively, the points $(\pm(P_i+P_{i-1}),0)$, $(0,\pm(P_i+P_{i-1}))$, and $(\pm P_i,\pm P_i)$ form approximate octagons in which the vertices are nearly equally distant from the origin and form uniform angles.

== Primes and squares ==
A Pell prime is a Pell number that is prime. The first few Pell primes are

2, 5, 29, 5741, 33461, 44560482149, 1746860020068409, 68480406462161287469, ... (sequence A086383 in the OEIS).

The indices of these primes within the sequence of all Pell numbers are

2, 3, 5, 11, 13, 29, 41, 53, 59, 89, 97, 101, 167, 181, 191, 523, 929, 1217, 1301, 1361, 2087, 2273, 2393, 8093, ... (sequence A096650 in the OEIS)

These indices are all themselves prime. As with the Fibonacci numbers, a Pell number P_{n} can only be prime if n itself is prime, because if d is a divisor of n then P_{d} is a divisor of P_{n}.

The only Pell numbers that are squares, cubes, or any higher power of an integer are 0, 1, and 169 = 13^{2}.

However, despite having so few squares or other powers, Pell numbers have a close connection to square triangular numbers. Specifically, these numbers arise from the following identity of Pell numbers:

$$\bigl(\left(P_{k-1}+P_k\right)\cdot P_k\bigr)^2 = \frac{\left(P_{k-1}+P_k\right)^2\cdot\left(\left(P_{k-1}+P_k\right)^2-(-1)^k\right)}{2}.$$

The left side of this identity describes a square number, while the right side describes a triangular number, so the result is a square triangular number.

Falcón and Díaz-Barrero (2006) proved another identity relating Pell numbers to squares and showing that the sum of the Pell numbers up to P_{4n+1} is always a square:

$$\sum_{i=0}^{4n+1} P_i = \left(\sum_{r=0}^n 2^r{2n+1\choose 2r}\right)^{\!2} = \left(P_{2n}+P_{2n+1}\right)^2.$$

For instance, the sum of the Pell numbers up to P_{5}, 0 + 1 + 2 + 5 + 12 + 29 = 49, is the square of P_{2} + P_{3} = 2 + 5 = 7. The numbers P_{2n} + P_{2n+1} forming the square roots of these sums,

1, 7, 41, 239, 1393, 8119, 47321, … (sequence A002315 in the OEIS),

are known as the Newman–Shanks–Williams (NSW) numbers.

== Pythagorean triples ==
Integer right triangles with nearly equal legs, derived from the Pell numbers.

If a right triangle has integer side lengths a, b, c (necessarily satisfying the Pythagorean theorem a^{2} + b^{2} = c^{2}), then (a,b,c) is known as a Pythagorean triple. As Martin (1875) describes, the Pell numbers can be used to form Pythagorean triples in which a and b are one unit apart, corresponding to right triangles that are nearly isosceles. Each such triple has the form

$$\left(2P_{n}P_{n+1}, P_{n+1}^2 - P_{n}^2, P_{n+1}^2 + P_{n}^2=P_{2n+1}\right).$$

The sequence of Pythagorean triples formed in this way is

(4,3,5), (20,21,29), (120,119,169), (696,697,985), …

== Pell–Lucas numbers ==
The companion Pell numbers or Pell–Lucas numbers are defined by the recurrence relation

$$Q_n=\begin{cases}2&\mbox{if }n=0;\\2&\mbox{if }n=1;\\2Q_{n-1}+Q_{n-2}&\mbox{otherwise.}\end{cases}$$

In words: the first two numbers in the sequence are both 2, and each successive number is formed by adding twice the previous Pell–Lucas number to the Pell–Lucas number before that, or equivalently, by adding the next Pell number to the previous Pell number: thus, 82 is the companion to 29, and 82 = 2 × 34 + 14 = 70 + 12. The first few terms of the sequence are (sequence A002203 in the OEIS): 2, 2, 6, 14, 34, 82, 198, 478, …

Like the relationship between Fibonacci numbers and Lucas numbers,

$$Q_n=\frac{P_{2n}}{P_n}$$

for all natural numbers n.

The companion Pell numbers can be expressed by the closed form formula

$$Q_n=\left(1+\sqrt 2\right)^n+\left(1-\sqrt 2\right)^n.$$

These numbers are all even; each such number is twice the numerator in one of the rational approximations to $\sqrt 2$ discussed above.

Like the Lucas sequence, if a Pell–Lucas number 1/2Q_{n} is prime, it is necessary that n be either prime or a power of 2. The Pell–Lucas primes are

3, 7, 17, 41, 239, 577, … (sequence A086395 in the OEIS).

For these n are

2, 3, 4, 5, 7, 8, 16, 19, 29, 47, 59, 163, 257, 421, … (sequence A099088 in the OEIS).

== Computations and connections ==
The following table gives the first few powers of the silver ratio δ = δ_{S} = 1 + √2 and its conjugate δ̅ = 1 − √2.

n	(1 + √2)^{n}	(1 − √2)^{n}
0	1 + 0√2 = 1	1 − 0√2 = 1
1	1 + 1√2 = 2.41421…	1 − 1√2 = −0.41421…
2	3 + 2√2 = 5.82842…	3 − 2√2 = 0.17157…
3	7 + 5√2 = 14.07106…	7 − 5√2 = −0.07106…
4	17 + 12√2 = 33.97056…	17 − 12√2 = 0.02943…
5	41 + 29√2 = 82.01219…	41 − 29√2 = −0.01219…
6	99 + 70√2 = 197.9949…	99 − 70√2 = 0.0050…
7	239 + 169√2 = 478.00209…	239 − 169√2 = −0.00209…
8	577 + 408√2 = 1153.99913…	577 − 408√2 = 0.00086…
9	1393 + 985√2 = 2786.00035…	1393 − 985√2 = −0.00035…
10	3363 + 2378√2 = 6725.99985…	3363 − 2378√2 = 0.00014…
11	8119 + 5741√2 = 16238.00006…	8119 − 5741√2 = −0.00006…
12	19601 + 13860√2 = 39201.99997…	19601 − 13860√2 = 0.00002…

The coefficients are the half-companion Pell numbers H_{n} and the Pell numbers P_{n} which are the (non-negative) solutions to H^{2} − 2P^{2} = ±1. A square triangular number is a number

$$N = \frac{t(t+1)}{2} = s^2,$$

which is both the t-th triangular number and the s-th square number. A near-isosceles Pythagorean triple is an integer solution to a^{2} + b^{2} = c^{2} where a + 1 = b.

The next table shows that splitting the odd number H_{n} into nearly equal halves gives a square triangular number when n is even and a near isosceles Pythagorean triple when n is odd. All solutions arise in this manner.

n	H_{n}	P_{n}	t	t + 1	s	a	b	c
0	1	0	0	1	0			
1	1	1				0	1	1
2	3	2	1	2	1			
3	7	5				3	4	5
4	17	12	8	9	6			
5	41	29				20	21	29
6	99	70	49	50	35			
7	239	169				119	120	169
8	577	408	288	289	204			
9	1393	985				696	697	985
10	3363	2378	1681	1682	1189			
11	8119	5741				4059	4060	5741
12	19601	13860	9800	9801	6930			

=== Definitions ===
The half-companion Pell numbers H_{n} and the Pell numbers P_{n} can be derived in a number of easily equivalent ways.

==== Raising to powers ====
$$\left(1+\sqrt2\right)^n = H_n+P_n\sqrt{2}$$

$$\left(1-\sqrt2\right)^n = H_n-P_n\sqrt{2}.$$

From this it follows that there are closed forms:

$$H_n = \frac{\left(1+\sqrt2\right)^n+\left(1-\sqrt2\right)^n}{2}.$$

and

$$P_n\sqrt2 = \frac{\left(1+\sqrt2\right)^n-\left(1-\sqrt2\right)^n}{2}.$$

==== Paired recurrences ====
$$H_n = \begin{cases}1&\mbox{if }n=0;\\H_{n-1}+2P_{n-1}&\mbox{otherwise.}\end{cases}$$

$$P_n = \begin{cases}0&\mbox{if }n=0;\\H_{n-1}+P_{n-1}&\mbox{otherwise.}\end{cases}$$

==== Reciprocal recurrence formulas ====
Let n be at least 2.

$$H_n = (3P_n-P_{n-2})/2 = 3P_{n-1}+P_{n-2};$$

$$P_n = (3H_n-H_{n-2})/4 = (3H_{n-1}+H_{n-2})/2.$$

==== Matrix formulations ====
$$\begin{pmatrix} H_n \\ P_n \end{pmatrix} = \begin{pmatrix} 1 & 2 \\ 1 & 1 \end{pmatrix} \begin{pmatrix} H_{n-1} \\ P_{n-1} \end{pmatrix} = \begin{pmatrix} 1 & 2 \\ 1 & 1 \end{pmatrix}^n \begin{pmatrix} 1 \\ 0 \end{pmatrix}.$$

So

$$\begin{pmatrix} H_n & 2P_n \\ P_n & H_n \end{pmatrix} = \begin{pmatrix} 1 & 2 \\ 1 & 1 \end{pmatrix}^n .$$

=== Approximations ===
The difference between H_{n} and P_{n}√2 is

$$\left(1-\sqrt2\right)^n \approx (-0.41421)^n,$$

which goes rapidly to zero. So

$$\left(1+\sqrt2\right)^n = H_n+P_n\sqrt2$$

is extremely close to 2H_{n}.

From this last observation it follows that the integer ratios H_{n}/P_{n} rapidly approach √2; and H_{n}/(H_{n−1}) and P_{n}/(P_{n−1}) rapidly approach 1 + √2.

=== H^{2} − 2P^{2} = ±1 ===
Since √2 is irrational, we cannot have H/P = √2, i.e.,

$$\frac{H^2}{P^2} = \frac{2P^2}{P^2}.$$

The best we can achieve is either

$$\frac{H^2}{P^2} = \frac{2P^2-1}{P^2}\quad \mbox{or} \quad \frac{H^2}{P^2} = \frac{2P^2+1}{P^2}.$$

The (non-negative) solutions to H^{2} − 2P^{2} = 1 are exactly the pairs (H_{n}, P_{n}) with n even, and the solutions to H^{2} − 2P^{2} = −1 are exactly the pairs (H_{n}, P_{n}) with n odd. To see this, note first that

$$H_{n+1}^2-2P_{n+1}^2 = \left(H_n+2P_n\right)^2-2\left(H_n+P_n\right)^2 = -\left(H_n^2-2P_n^2\right),$$

so that these differences, starting with H^{2}_{0} − 2P^{2}_{0} = 1, are alternately 1 and −1. Then note that every positive solution comes in this way from a solution with smaller integers since

$$(2P-H)^2-2(H-P)^2 = -\left(H^2-2P^2\right).$$

The smaller solution also has positive integers, with the one exception: H = P = 1 which comes from H_{0} = 1 and P_{0} = 0.

=== Square triangular numbers ===
The required equation

$$\frac{t(t+1)}{2}=s^2$$

is equivalent to $4t^2+4t+1 = 8s^2+1,$ which becomes H^{2} = 2P^{2} + 1 with the substitutions H = 2t + 1 and P = 2s. Hence the n-th solution is

$$t_n = \frac{H_{2n}-1}{2} \quad\mbox{and}\quad s_n = \frac{P_{2n}}{2}.$$

Observe that t and t + 1 are relatively prime, so that (t(t + 1))/2 = s^{2} happens exactly when they are adjacent integers, one a square H^{2} and the other twice a square 2P^{2}. Since we know all solutions of that equation, we also have

$$t_n=\begin{cases}2P_n^2&\mbox{if }n\mbox{ is even};\\H_{n}^2&\mbox{if }n\mbox{ is odd.}\end{cases}$$

and $s_n=H_nP_n.$

This alternate expression is seen in the next table.

n	H_{n}	P_{n}	t	t + 1	s	a	b	c
0	1	0						
1	1	1	1	2	1	3	4	5
2	3	2	8	9	6	20	21	29
3	7	5	49	50	35	119	120	169
4	17	12	288	289	204	696	697	985
5	41	29	1681	1682	1189	4059	4060	5741
6	99	70	9800	9801	6930	23660	23661	33461

=== Pythagorean triples ===
The equality c^{2} = a^{2} + (a + 1)^{2} = 2a^{2} + 2a + 1 occurs exactly when 2c^{2} = 4a^{2} + 4a + 2 which becomes 2P^{2} = H^{2} + 1 with the substitutions H = 2a + 1 and P = c. Hence the n-th solution is a_{n} = (H_{2n+1} − 1)/2 and c_{n} = P_{2n+1}.

The table above shows that, in one order or the other, a_{n} and b_{n} = a_{n} + 1 are H_{n}H_{n+1} and 2P_{n}P_{n+1} while c_{n} = H_{n+1}P_{n} + P_{n+1}H_{n}.
