= Tribonacci ratio =

Number, approximately 1.83929

- A tribonacci rectangle contains two scaled copies of itself, τ = ((τ − 1)^{2} + 2(τ − 1) + 1) / τ
- Rationality: irrational algebraic
- Symbol: τ

Representations
- Decimal: 1.83928675521416113255...
- Algebraic form: real root of x^{3} = x^{2} + x + 1
- Continued fraction (linear): [1;1,5,4,2,305,1,8,2,1,4,6,14,...] not periodic infinite

In mathematics, the tribonacci ratio is a geometrical proportion, given by the unique real solution of the equation x^{3} = x^{2} + x + 1. Its decimal expansion begins with 1.839286755214161... (sequence A058265 in the OEIS).

The moniker tribonacci was introduced by high-school student Mark Feinberg in an article published in the Fibonacci Quarterly of October 1963.

== Definition ==
τ = (a+b+c)/a = a/b = b/c. With b = 1 the boxes have volumes τ^{3} = τ^{2} (red) + τ (green) + 1 (blue).

Three quantities a > b > c > 0 are in the tribonacci ratio if
$$\frac{a+b+c}{a} =\frac{a}{b} =\frac{b}{c} =\tau$$
This ratio is commonly denoted $\tau.$

Substituting $b =\tau c$ and $a =\tau b =\tau^2 c$ in the first fraction gives
$$\tau =\frac{c(\tau^2 +\tau +1)}{\tau^2 c}.$$
It follows that the tribonacci ratio is the unique real solution of the cubic equation $\tau^3 =\tau^2 +\tau +1$.

Closed-form expressions for $\tau$ are found by solving the depressed cubic $y^3 -\tfrac43 y -\tfrac{38}{27}$, which has real zero $\tau -\tfrac13$.
$$\begin{align}
w_{1,2} &=19 \pm 3\sqrt{33} \\
\tau &=\left(1 +\sqrt[3]{w_1} +\sqrt[3]{w_2} \right) /3 \\
&= \frac13 +\frac43 \cosh \left( \frac13 \operatorname{arcosh} \left( \frac{19}{8} \right) \right).
\end{align}$$

Dividing the defining polynomial $z^3 -z^2 -z -1$ by $z -\tau$ one obtains $z^2 +(\tau -1)z +1 /\tau$, and the conjugate elements of $\tau$ are
$$z_{1,2} = \left( 1 -\tau \pm i \sqrt{(\tau +1)(3\tau -5)} \right) /2 ,$$
with $z_1 +z_2 =1 -\tau$ and $z_1 z_2 =1 /\tau$.

Unit circle and hyperbola (x + 1) y = 1.

The point of intersection $P =(x,y)$ with $x \ne 0$ of unit circle $x^2 +y^2 =1$ and rectangular hyperbola $y =\frac{1}{x+1}$ is $(\tau -1,\tau^{-1}).$ Substituting for $y$, the equation of the abscissa is $\, x^3 +2x^2 -2 =0 \,$ or $\, x^2 (x +2) =2.$

Dividing both sides by $\, x+2$ results in the fixed point iteration $\, x_{n+1} \to \sqrt{ \frac{2}{2 +x_n} } \,,$ and the continued reciprocal square root
$$\tau -1 =\sqrt{\cfrac{2}{2+\sqrt{\cfrac{2}{2+\sqrt{\cfrac{2}{2 +\ddots}}}}}}$$
An image of the Julia set of the backward iteration $\, z_{n-1} \to \frac{2}{z^2_n} -2 \,$ in the complex plane is found below.

Alternative expressions for the tribonacci ratio are derived from the reciprocal equation, that is, the depressed cubic $\, 2x^3 -2x -1 \,$ with real zero $\frac{1}{\tau-1}$ and discriminant $-44$.
$$\begin{align}
w_{1,2} &=\left( 1 \pm \frac13 \sqrt{ \frac{11}{3}} \right) /4 \\
\tau &=1 +(\sqrt[3]{w_1} +\sqrt[3]{w_2})^{-1} \\
&= 1 +\frac{\sqrt3}{2} \operatorname{sech}\left( \frac13 \operatorname{arcosh} \left( \frac{3\sqrt3}{4} \right) \right).
\end{align}$$

Additionally, $\, 2x^3 =2x +1 \,$ leads to the infinite radical
$$\frac{1}{\tau-1} =\sqrt[3]{\tfrac12 +\sqrt[3]{\tfrac12 +\sqrt[3]{\tfrac12 +\cdots}}}$$

$\frac{1}{\tau-1}$ is the superstable fixed point of the Newton iteration $x \to (2x^3 +\tfrac12) /(3x^2 -1)$.

== Properties ==
Rectangles with aspect ratios 1/(τ−1), τ, τ/(τ−1) tile the square.

The tribonacci ratio can be written in terms of itself as fractions
$$\begin{align}
\tau &=\frac{\tau^2 +1}{\tau^2 -1} \\
\tau^2 &=\frac{\tau +1}{\tau -1} \\
\tau^3 &=\frac{\tau^4 +1}{2} \\
\tau^4 &=\frac{\,(\tau +1)^3}{2}.\end{align}$$

Similarly as the infinite geometric series
$$\begin{align}
\frac{\tau^2 +1}{2} &=\sum_{n=0}^{\infty} \tau^{-n} \\
\frac{\tau +1}{2} &=\sum_{n=0}^{\infty} \tau^{-2n} \\
\frac{1}{\tau -1} &=\sum_{n=0}^{\infty} \tau^{-3n} \\
\frac{\tau}{2(\tau -1)} &=\sum_{n=0}^{\infty} \tau^{-4n}.\end{align}$$

For every integer $n$ one has
$$\begin{align}
\tau^n &=\tau^{n-1} +\tau^{n-2} +\tau^{n-3} \\
&=2\tau^{n-2} +2\tau^{n-3} +\tau^{n-4} \\
&=3\tau^{n-2} +\tau^{n-4} +\tau^{n-6}
\end{align}$$
from this an infinite number of further relations can be found. A notable example is $\tau +\tau^{-3} =2$.

Continued fraction pattern of a few low powers
$$\begin{align}
\tau^{-1} &=[0;1,1,5,4,2,305,1,8,2,...] \approx 0.5437 \;(\tfrac{31}{57}) \\
\tau^0 &=[1] \\
\tau^1 &=[1;1,5,4,2,305,1,8,2,1,...] \approx 1.8393 \;(\tfrac{103}{56}) \\
\tau^2 &=[3;2,1,1,1,1,2,1,152,2,...] \approx 3.3830 \;(\tfrac{159}{47}) \\
\tau^3 &=[6;4,2,305,1,8,2,1,4,6,...] \approx 6.2223 \;(\tfrac{56}{9}) \\
\tau^4 &=[11;2,4,152,1,17,1,2,2,...] \approx 11.4445 \;(\tfrac{103}{9})
\end{align}$$

The tribonacci ratio is the fourth smallest cubic Pisot number. By definition of these numbers, the absolute value $1 /\sqrt{\tau}$ of the algebraic conjugates is smaller than 1, thus powers of $\tau$ generate almost integers. For example: $\tau^{18} =58034.99919...$ $\approx 58035 -1/1234$. After 18 rotation steps the phases of the inward spiraling conjugate pair – initially close to $\pm 9\pi /13$ – nearly align with the imaginary axis.

The first implied mention of the tribonacci constant was in the eleventh century, when the Persian poet and polymath Omar Khayyam found the solution $10\tfrac{\tau+1}{\tau}$ of the cubic $x^3 +200x =20x^2 +2000$ by considering the intersection of a circle and a rectangular hyperbola.

$W_{11}(x) = x^3 -2x^2 +2x -2,$ with real zero $\omega =\tfrac{\tau+1}{\tau} =\tau(\tau -1),$ is the Weber class polynomial associated with discriminant $\Delta=-11$. Properties of the related Klein j-invariant result in near-identity $\omega \approx (e^{\pi \sqrt{-\Delta}} +24)^{1/24}.$

Benne de Weger's example for the algebraic abc conjecture derives from the Binet-type expression for the zero element at index 52 of the Berstel sequence. The companion polynomial to the recurrence relation is $x^3 -2x^2 +4x -4$, with real zero $\alpha =2\tfrac{\tau}{\tau +1}$.

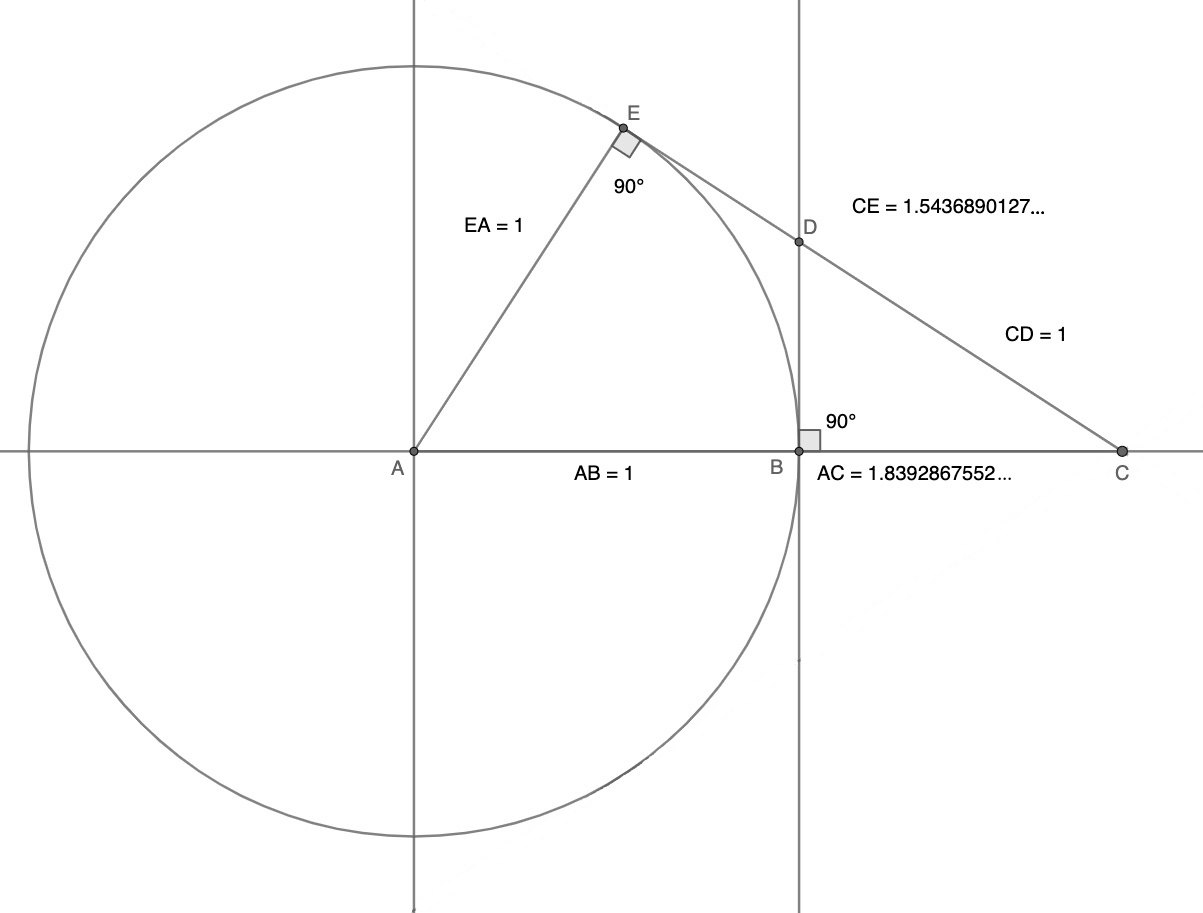
Construction of the tribonacci ratio with compass and marked ruler. BC = τ − 1 and BD = 1/τ.

Argument $\theta =\arccos(\tfrac12 \tau) \,$ satisfies $\, 4\sin(3\theta) -\tan(\theta) =\sqrt{11}$, a result which is related through distance parameter $\, z =\tau(1 -\tau) \cdot 2\cos(\tfrac{2\pi}{11})$ to the 'miraculous' neusis construction of the hendecagon, found by Benjamin and Snyder.

The reciprocal $\tfrac{1}{\tau}$ of the tribonacci ratio solves the equation $\, 2\arctan(x) =\arccos(x)$. The angle is close to 1 radian. Its complement $\, \arccos(\tau-1) =\arcsin(\tfrac{1}{\tau}) \,$ figures in the geometric construction of the tribonacci constant found by biologist Xerardo Neira.

The tribonacci ratio is particularly important in the study of the snub cube: all its metrics can be expressed in terms of $\tau$.

== Tribonacci sequence ==
The first muddled mention of the tribonacci sequence is in Charles Darwin's On the Origin of Species (1859), illustrating the population growth of elephants on the supposition that during their lifetime each pair of parents produces three pair of young.

The number of compositions of n − 2 into parts 1, 2 and 3 is counted by the nth tribonacci number (n > 1).

The tribonacci sequence is defined by the third-order recurrence relation
$$T_n =T_{n-1} +T_{n-2} +T_{n-3} \text{ for } n >2,$$
with initial values
$$T_0 =T_1 =0, T_2 =1.$$

The first few terms are 0, 0, 1, 1, 2, 4, 7, 13, 24, 44, 81, 149, 274, 504, 927,... (sequence A000073 in the OEIS).
The limit ratio between consecutive terms is the tribonacci constant:$\lim_{n\rightarrow \infty} T_{n+1}/T_n =\tau.$
An alternative relation for $n >3$ is $\, T_n =2T_{n-1} -T_{n-4}.$

The generating function of the tribonacci sequence is
$$\frac{x^2}{1 -x -x^2 -x^3} =\sum_{n=0}^{\infty} T_n x^n \text{ for } x <\tfrac{1}{\tau}$$

Taking the sum of the first $n$ terms gives
$$\frac12 (T_{n-1} +T_{n+1} -1) =\sum_{k=0}^{n-1} {T_k}$$

Expressing the terms as sums of binomial coefficients
$$T_{n+2} =\sum_{i=0}^{\lfloor n/2 \rfloor} \sum_{j=0}^{i} {i \choose j}{n-i-j \choose i}$$

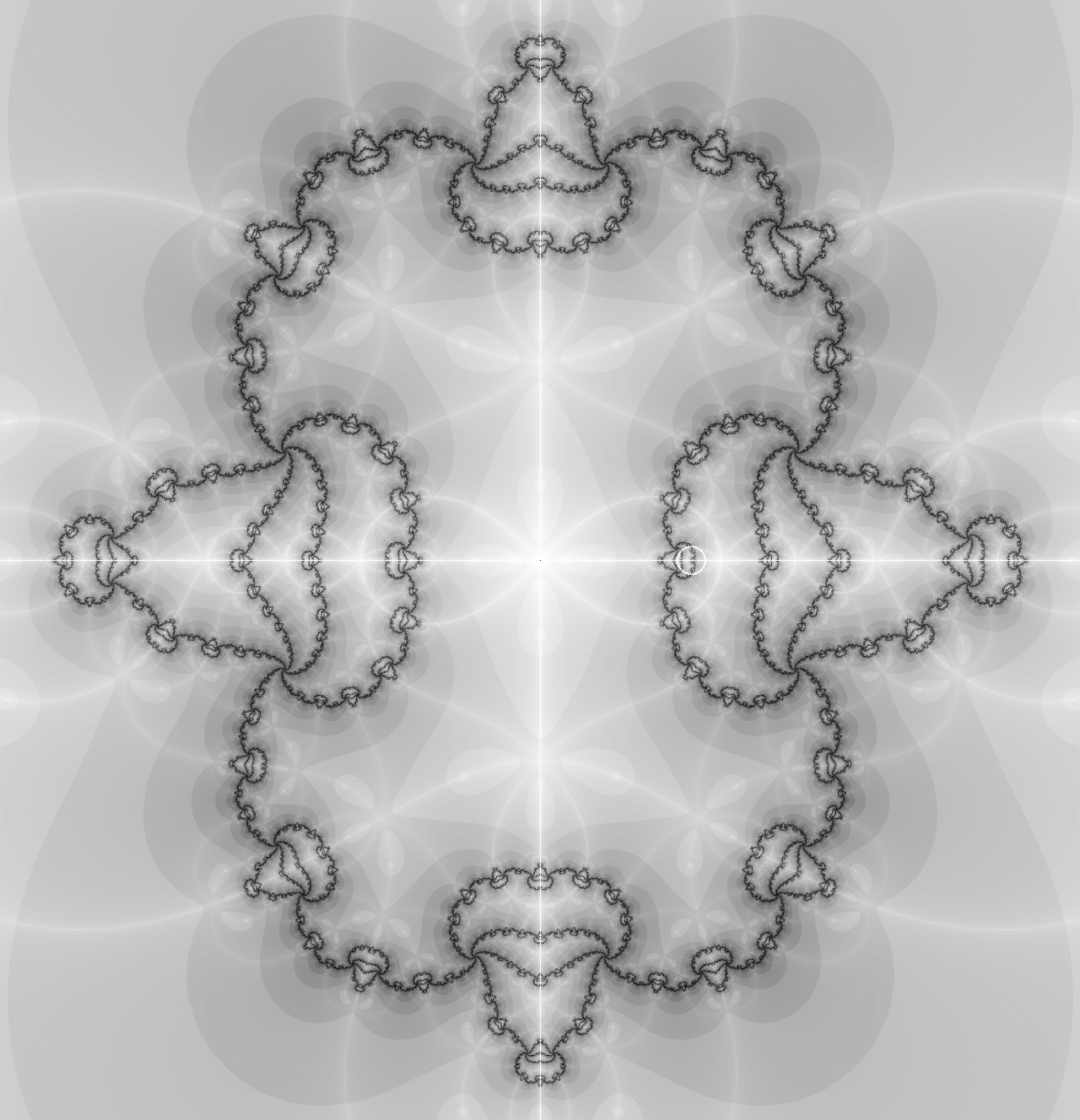
Julia set (in black) of the map z → 2/z^{2} − 2 with a single attracting, real five-point limit cycle. Viewport width [−3,3], pole z_{p} = 0. The tiny white circle is centred at repelling fixed point z_{f} = τ − 1.

The sequence is extended to negative indices using
$$T_n =T_{n+3} -T_{n+2} -T_{n+1},$$
obtaining (0), 1,−1, 0, 2,−3, 1, 4,−8, 5, 7,−20, 18, 9,−47,... (sequence A057597 in the OEIS).

The relationship between the negative and positive indexed segments of the sequence is given by
$$T_{1-n} =T_n^2 - T_{n+1} T_{n-1}.$$
This reflection formula holds for all integers $n$ and can be derived from Agronomof's identity
$$T_{n+k} = T_{k+1} T_{n+1} + \left(T_k +T_{k-1} \right) T_n + T_k T_{n-1}.$$

Powers of the tribonacci ratio can be written with tribonacci numbers as quadratic coefficients
$$\tau^n =\tau^2 T_{n} +\tau (T_{n-1} +T_{n-2}) +T_{n-1},$$
which is proved by mathematical induction on $n.$ This relation also holds for $n < 0.$ The order of the coefficients corresponds to the bottom row of matrix $Q$ below.

Let $\tau$ and complex conjugate pair $\beta$ and $\gamma$ be the zeros of polynomial $f:x^3 -x^2 -x -1$ with discriminant $-44$, the tribonacci numbers are then given by the Binet formula
$$T_{n+1} =a \tau^n +b \beta^n +c \gamma^n ,$$
with real $a$ and conjugates $b$ and $c$ the roots of $44y^3 -2y -1 =0.$

Since $\left\vert b \beta^n +c \gamma^n \right\vert < \tfrac25$, the number $T_n$ is the nearest integer to $\,a\,\tau^{n-1}$, with $n > 0$ and coefficient $a =\tau^2 /(\tau^3 +\tau +2) =$ 0.3362281169949410942253629... (Note: Constant 𝑎 comes from Simon Plouffe's 1992 formula, its minimal polynomial can be found with an integer relation algorithm.)

The tribonacci numbers are obtained as integral powers $n \ge 2$ of companion matrix $Q$ to characteristic polynomial $f$ with dominant eigenvalue $\tau$
$$Q = \begin{pmatrix} 1 & 1 & 1 \\ 1 & 0 & 0 \\ 0 & 1 & 0 \end{pmatrix}$$
By the Cayley–Hamilton theorem,
$$Q^n = \begin{pmatrix}  T_{n+2} & T_{n+1} +T_{n} & T_{n+1} \\ T_{n+1} & T_{n} +T_{n-1} & T_{n} \\ T_{n} & T_{n-1} +T_{n-2} & T_{n-1} \end{pmatrix}$$

The trace of $Q^n$ gives the tribonacci-Lucas numbers 3, 1, 3, 7, 11, 21, 39, 71, 131, 241, 443, 815, 1499, 2757,... satisfying the same recurrence relation. Variously, $L_n =\lfloor \tau^n \rceil \text{ for } n >3.$ (sequence A001644 in the OEIS)

These Lucas numbers have the Fermat property: if p is prime, $L_{p} \equiv L_1 \bmod p .$ The converse does not hold, but the small number of tribonacci pseudoprimes $\,n \mid (L_n -1)$ makes the sequence special. The only composite numbers below 10^{7} to pass the test are n = 182, 25201, 233^{2}, 63618, 194390, 750890, 804055, 1889041, 2487941, 3542533, 3761251, 6829689. (sequence A371805 in the OEIS)

The tribonacci word sequence on the alphabet $\{a,b,c\}$ is defined by the substitution rule
$$\begin{cases}
a \;\mapsto \;ab \\
b \;\mapsto \;ac \\
c \;\mapsto \;a \end{cases}$$
With initiator $w_0=c$, the first seven words are
$$c,a,ab,ab.ac,abac.aba,abacaba.abacab,abacabaabacab.abacabaabac$$
For $n \ge 3$, the series of words $w_n$ produced by iterating the substitution are similarly obtained by concatenating the previous three: $w_n =w_{n-1} +w_{n-2} +w_{n-3}.$ The number of c, b and a's in each word is equal to successive tribonacci numbers and the word length $l(w_n) =T_{n+2}$. The tribonacci word sequence is the basis of the construction of the classic Rauzy fractal.

The four-number game played with sets $S_0$ of successive tribonacci numbers $\{ T_{n-3},T_{n-2},T_{n-1},T_n \}$, and circular shifts or reflections thereof, results in subsequent maximum run lengths $l(S_0) =3\lfloor \tfrac{n-1}{2} \rfloor,$ $n \ge 3$. A game of infinite length is obtained by taking real elements $S_0 =\{ 1,\tau,\tau^2,\tau^3 \},$ given to unlimited precision.

== Tribonacci spiral ==
Tribonacci spirals with different initial radii on a τ− rectangle.

A tribonacci spiral is a logarithmic spiral that gets wider by a factor of $\tau$ for every quarter turn. It is described by the polar equation $r( \theta) =a \exp(k \theta),$ with initial radius $a$ and parameter $k =\frac{2}{\pi} \ln( \tau).$

If drawn on a tribonacci rectangle, the spiral has its pole at the foot of altitude of a triangle on the diagonal and passes through vertices of rectangles with aspect ratio $\tau(\tau -1)$ which are perpendicularly aligned and successively scaled by a factor $\tau^{-1}$. The pole of the spiral divides the main diagonal in ratio $\tau^2$ and bisects the diagonal of the lower right rectangle.

== See also ==
Solutions of equations similar to $x^3 =x^2 +x +1$:

- Golden ratio – the positive solution of the equation $x^2 =x +1$
- Plastic ratio – the real solution of the equation $x^3 =x +1$
- Supergolden ratio – the real solution of the equation $x^3 =x^2 +1$
