= David William Boyd =

Canadian mathematician

David William Boyd (born 17 September 1941) is a Canadian mathematician who does research on harmonic and classical analysis, inequalities related to geometry, number theory, and polynomial factorization, sphere packing, number theory involving Diophantine approximation and Mahler's measure, and computer computations.

Boyd received in 1963 his B.Sc. with Honours from Carleton University, then in 1964 his M.A. and in 1966 his Ph.D. from the University of Toronto under Paul George Rooney with thesis The Hilbert transformation on rearrangement invariant Banach spaces. Boyd became in 1966–67 an assistant professor at the University of Alberta, in 1967–70 an assistant professor and in 1970–71 an associate professor at the California Institute of Technology, and in 1971–74 an associate professor, in 1974–2007 a professor, and since 2007 a professor emeritus at the University of British Columbia.

Boyd has done research on classical and harmonic analysis, including interpolation spaces, integral transforms, and potential theory, and research on inequalities involving geometry, number theory, polynomials, and applications to polynomial factorization. He has also worked, especially in the 1970s, on sphere packing, in particular, Apollonian packing and limit sets of Kleinian groups. Boyd has studied number theory, such as diophantine approximation, the Pisot and Salem numbers, Pisot sequences, Mahler’s measure, applications to symbolic dynamics, and special values of L-functions and polylogarithms. He is also interested in mathematical computation, including numerical analysis, symbolic computation, and computational number theory, and also geometric topology, including hyperbolic manifolds and computation of invariants.

His doctoral students include Peter Borwein.

== Awards and honours ==
- Killam Senior Research Fellowship, 1976–77 and 1981–82
- Steacie Prize, 1978
- Coxeter–James Prize, Canadian Mathematical Society, 1979
- Elected to Fellowship of the Royal Society of Canada, 1980
- Jeffery–Williams Prize, Canadian Mathematical Society, 2001
- CRM–Fields Prize, Centre de Recherches Mathématiques & Fields Institute, 2005
- Elected to Fellowship of the American Mathematical Society, 2013
- Inaugural fellow of the Canadian Mathematical Society, 2018

== Editorships ==
- Associate editor, Canadian Journal of Mathematics, 1981–1991
- Associate editor, Mathematics of Computation, 1998 – 2007
- Associate editor, Contributions to Discrete Mathematics, 2006–present

== Selected works ==
- Mahler's measure and special values of L-functions, Experimental Mathematics, vol. 37, 1998, pp. 37–82
- Mahler's measure and invariants of hyperbolic manifolds, in M. A. Bennett (ed.) Number theory for the Millennium, A. K. Peters 2000, pp. 127–143
- Mahler's measure, hyperbolic manifolds and the dilogarithm, Canadian Mathematical Society Notes, vol. 34, no. 2, 2002, 3–4, 26–28 (Jeffery Williams Lecture)
- with F. Rodriguez Villegas: Mahler's measure and the dilogarithm, part 1, Canadian J. Math., vol, 54, 2002, pp. 468–492
