= Plastic number =

Plastic number may refer to:

- Plastic ratio, a mathematical ratio
- Resin identification code, a number used to identify plastic products
