= Lehmer's conjecture =

Proposed lower bound on the Mahler measure for polynomials with integer coefficients

Lehmer's conjecture, also known as the Lehmer's Mahler measure problem, is a problem in number theory raised by Derrick Henry Lehmer. The conjecture asserts that there is an absolute constant $\mu>1$ such that every polynomial with integer coefficients $P(x)\in\mathbb{Z}[x]$ satisfies one of the following properties:

- The Mahler measure $\mathcal{M}(P(x))$ of $P(x)$ is greater than or equal to $\mu$.
- $P(x)$ is an integral multiple of a product of cyclotomic polynomials or the monomial $x$, in which case $\mathcal{M}(P(x))=1$. (Equivalently, every complex root of $P(x)$ is a root of unity or zero.)

There are a number of definitions of the Mahler measure, one of which is to factor $P(x)$ over $\mathbb{C}$ as

$$P(x)=a_0 (x-\alpha_1)(x-\alpha_2)\cdots(x-\alpha_D),$$

and then set

$$\mathcal{M}(P(x)) = |a_0| \prod_{i=1}^{D} \max(1,|\alpha_i|).$$

The smallest known Mahler measure (greater than 1) is for "Lehmer's polynomial"

$$P(x)= x^{10}+x^9-x^7-x^6-x^5-x^4-x^3+x+1 \,,$$

for which the Mahler measure is the Salem number

$$\mathcal{M}(P(x))=1.176280818\dots \ .$$

It is widely believed that this example represents the true minimal value: that is, $\mu=1.176280818\dots$ in Lehmer's conjecture.

== Motivation ==
Consider Mahler measure for one variable and Jensen's formula shows that if $P(x)=a_0 (x-\alpha_1)(x-\alpha_2)\cdots(x-\alpha_D)$ then

$$\mathcal{M}(P(x)) = |a_0| \prod_{i=1}^{D} \max(1,|\alpha_i|).$$

In this paragraph denote $m(P)=\log(\mathcal{M}(P(x))$ , which is also called Mahler measure.

If $P$ has integer coefficients, this shows that $\mathcal{M}(P)$ is an algebraic number so $m(P)$ is the logarithm of an algebraic integer. It also shows that $m(P)\ge 0$ and that if $m(P)=0$ then $P$ is a product of cyclotomic polynomials i.e. monic polynomials whose all roots are roots of unity, or a monomial polynomial of $x$ i.e. a power $x^n$ for some $n$ .

Lehmer noticed that $m(P)=0$ is an important value in the study of the integer sequences $\Delta_n=\text{Res}(P(x), x^n-1)=\prod^D_{i=1}(\alpha_i^n-1)$ for monic $P$ . If $P$ does not vanish on the circle then $\lim|\Delta_n|^{1/n}=\mathcal{M}(P)$. If $P$ does vanish on the circle but not at any root of unity, then the same convergence holds by Baker's theorem (in fact an earlier result of Gelfond is sufficient for this, as pointed out by Lind in connection with his study of quasihyperbolic toral automorphisms). As a result, Lehmer was led to ask

whether there is a constant $c>0$ such that $m(P)>c$ provided $P$ is not cyclotomic?,

or

given $c>0$, are there $P$ with integer coefficients for which $0<m(P)<c$?

Some positive answers have been provided as follows, but Lehmer's conjecture is not yet completely proved and is still a question of much interest.

== Partial results ==
Let $P(x)\in\mathbb{Z}[x]$ be an irreducible monic polynomial of degree $D$.

Smyth proved that Lehmer's conjecture is true for all polynomials that are not reciprocal, i.e., all polynomials satisfying $x^DP(x^{-1})\ne P(x)$.

Blanksby and Montgomery and Stewart independently proved that there is an absolute constant $C>1$ such that either $\mathcal{M}(P(x))=1$ or

$$\log\mathcal{M}(P(x))\ge \frac{C}{D\log D}.$$

Dobrowolski improved this to

$$\log\mathcal{M}(P(x))\ge C\left(\frac{\log\log D}{\log D}\right)^3.$$

Dobrowolski obtained the value C ≥ 1/1200 and asymptotically C > 1-ε for all sufficiently large D. Voutier in 1996 obtained C ≥ 1/4 for D ≥ 2.

== Elliptic analogues ==
Let $E/K$ be an elliptic curve defined over a number field $K$, and let $\hat{h}_E:E(\bar{K})\to\mathbb{R}$ be the canonical height function. The canonical height is the analogue for elliptic curves of the function $(\deg P)^{-1}\log\mathcal{M}(P(x))$. It has the property that $\hat{h}_E(Q)=0$ if and only if $Q$ is a torsion point in $E(\bar{K})$. The elliptic Lehmer conjecture asserts that there is a constant $C(E/K)>0$ such that

$\hat{h}_E(Q) \ge \frac{C(E/K)}{D}$ for all non-torsion points $Q\in E(\bar{K})$,

where $D=[K(Q):K]$. If the elliptic curve E has complex multiplication, then the analogue of Dobrowolski's result holds:

$$\hat{h}_E(Q) \ge \frac{C(E/K)}{D} \left(\frac{\log\log D}{\log D}\right)^3 ,$$

due to Laurent. For arbitrary elliptic curves, the best known result is

$$\hat{h}_E(Q) \ge \frac{C(E/K)}{D^3(\log D)^2},$$

due to Masser. For elliptic curves with non-integral j-invariant, this has been improved to

$$\hat{h}_E(Q) \ge \frac{C(E/K)}{D^2(\log D)^2},$$

by Hindry and Silverman.

== Restricted results ==
Stronger results are known for restricted classes of polynomials or algebraic numbers.

If P(x) is not reciprocal then

$$M(P) \ge M(x^3 - x - 1) \approx 1.3247$$

and this is clearly best possible. If further all the coefficients of P are odd then

$$M(P) \ge M(x^2 -x - 1) \approx 1.618 .$$

For any algebraic number α, let $M(\alpha)$ be the Mahler measure of the minimal polynomial $P_\alpha$ of α. If the field Q(α) is a Galois extension of Q, then Lehmer's conjecture holds for $P_\alpha$.

== Relation to structure of compact group automorphisms ==
The measure-theoretic entropy of an ergodic automorphism of a compact metrizable abelian group is known to be given by the logarithmic Mahler measure of a polynomial with integer coefficients if it is finite. As pointed out by Lind, this means that the set of possible values of the entropy of such actions is either all of $(0,\infty]$ or a countable set depending on the solution to Lehmer's problem. Lind also showed that the infinite-dimensional torus either has ergodic automorphisms of finite positive entropy or only has automorphisms of infinite entropy depending on the solution to Lehmer's problem. Since an ergodic compact group automorphism is measurably isomorphic to a Bernoulli shift, and the Bernoulli shifts are classified up to measurable isomorphism by their entropy by Ornstein's theorem, this means that the moduli space of all ergodic compact group automorphisms up to measurable isomorphism is either countable or uncountable depending on the solution to Lehmer's problem.
