= Silver number =

Silver number may refer to:

- Silver ratio 1 + √2
- Plastic ratio, the real root of the cubic equation x^{3} = x + 1
- Gold-to-silver ratio
