= Mahler measure =

Measure of polynomial height

In mathematics, the Mahler measure $M(p)$ of a polynomial $p(z)$ with complex coefficients is defined as

$$M(p) = |a|\prod_{|\alpha_i| \ge 1} |\alpha_i| = |a| \prod_{i=1}^n \max\{1,|\alpha_i|\},$$
where $p(z)$ factorizes over the complex numbers $\mathbb{C}$ as
$$p(z) = a(z-\alpha_1)(z-\alpha_2)\cdots(z-\alpha_n).$$

The Mahler measure can be viewed as a kind of height function. Using Jensen's formula, it can be proved that this measure is also equal to the geometric mean of $|p(z)|$ for $z$ on the unit circle (i.e., $|z| = 1$):
$$M(p) = \exp\left(\int_{0}^{1} \ln(|p(e^{2\pi i\theta})|)\, d\theta \right).$$

By extension, the Mahler measure of an algebraic number $\alpha$ is defined as the Mahler measure of the minimal polynomial of $\alpha$ over $\mathbb{Q}$. In particular, if $\alpha$ is a Pisot number or a Salem number, then its Mahler measure is simply $\alpha$.

The Mahler measure is named after the German-born Australian mathematician Kurt Mahler.

== Properties ==
- The Mahler measure is multiplicative: $\forall p, q, \,\, M(p \cdot q) = M(p) \cdot M(q).$
- $M(p) = \lim_{\tau \to 0} \|p\|_{\tau}$ where $\, \|p\|_\tau =\left(\int_0^{1} |p(e^{2\pi i\theta})|^\tau d\theta \right)^{1/\tau}$ is the $L_\tau$ norm of $p$.
- Kronecker's Theorem: If $p$ is an irreducible monic integer polynomial with $M(p) = 1$, then either $p(z) = z,$ or $p$ is a cyclotomic polynomial.
- (Lehmer's conjecture) There is a constant $\mu>1$ such that if $p$ is an irreducible integer polynomial, then either $M(p)=1$ or $M(p)>\mu$.
- The Mahler measure of a monic integer polynomial is a Perron number.

== Higher-dimensional Mahler measure ==
The Mahler measure $M(p)$ of a multi-variable polynomial $p(x_1,\ldots,x_n) \in \mathbb{C}[x_1,\ldots,x_n]$ is defined similarly by the formula

$$M(p) = \exp\left(\int_0^{1} \int_0^{1} \cdots \int_0^{1} \log \Bigl( \bigl |p(e^{2\pi i\theta_1}, e^{2\pi i\theta_2}, \ldots, e^{2\pi i\theta_n}) \bigr| \Bigr) \, d\theta_1\, d\theta_2\cdots d\theta_n \right).$$
It inherits the above three properties of the Mahler measure for a one-variable polynomial.

The multi-variable Mahler measure has been shown, in some cases, to be related to special values of zeta-functions and $L$-functions. For example, in 1981, Smyth proved the formulas
$$m(1+x+y)=\frac{3\sqrt{3}}{4\pi}L(\chi_{-3},2)$$
where $L(\chi_{-3},s)$ is a Dirichlet L-function, and
$$m(1+x+y+z)=\frac{7}{2\pi^2}\zeta(3),$$
where $\zeta$ is the Riemann zeta function. Here $m(P)=\log M(P)$ is called the logarithmic Mahler measure.

=== Some results by Lawton and Boyd ===
From the definition, the Mahler measure is viewed as the integrated values of polynomials over the torus (also see Lehmer's conjecture). If $p$ vanishes on the torus $(S^1)^n$, then the convergence of the integral defining $M(p)$ is not obvious, but it is known that $M(p)$ does converge and is equal to a limit of one-variable Mahler measures, which had been conjectured by Boyd.

This is formulated as follows: Let $\mathbb{Z}$ denote the integers and define $\mathbb{Z}^N_+=\{r=(r_1,\dots,r_N)\in\mathbb{Z}^N:r_j\ge0\ \text{for}\ 1\le j\le N\}$ . If $Q(z_1,\dots,z_N)$ is a polynomial in $N$ variables and $r=(r_1,\dots,r_N)\in\mathbb{Z}^N_+$ define the polynomial $Q_r(z)$ of one variable by

$$Q_r(z):=Q(z^{r_1},\dots,z^{r_N})$$

and define $q(r)$ by
$$q(r) := \min \left\{H(s):s=(s_1,\dots,s_N)\in\mathbb{Z}^N, s\ne(0,\dots,0)~\text{and}~\sum^N_{j=1} s_j r_j = 0 \right\}$$

where $H(s)=\max\{|s_j|:1\le j\le N\}$.

Theorem (Lawton)—Let $Q(z_1,\dots,z_N)$ be a polynomial in N variables with complex coefficients. Then the following limit is valid (even if the condition that $r_i \geq 0$ is relaxed):
$$\lim_{q(r)\to\infty}M(Q_r)=M(Q)$$

=== Boyd's proposal ===
Boyd provided more general statements than the above theorem. He pointed out that the classical Kronecker's theorem, which characterizes monic polynomials with integer coefficients all of whose roots are inside the unit disk, can be regarded as characterizing those polynomials of one variable whose measure is exactly 1, and that this result extends to polynomials in several variables.

Define an extended cyclotomic polynomial to be a polynomial of the form
$$\Psi(z)=z_1^{b_1} \dots z_n^{b_n}\Phi_m(z_1^{v_1}\dots z_n^{v_n}),$$
where $\Phi_m(z)$ is the m-th cyclotomic polynomial, the $v_i$ are integers, and the $b_i = \max(0, -v_i\deg\Phi_m)$ are chosen minimally so that $\Psi(z)$ is a polynomial in the $z_i$. Let $K_n$ be the set of polynomials that are products of monomials $\pm z_1^{c_1}\dots z_n^{c_n}$ and extended cyclotomic polynomials.

Theorem (Boyd)—Let $F(z_1,\dots,z_n)\in\mathbb{Z}[z_1,\ldots,z_n]$ be a polynomial with integer coefficients. Then $M(F)=1$ if and only if $F$ is an element of $K_n$.

This led Boyd to consider the set of values
$$L_n:=\bigl\{m(P(z_1,\dots,z_n)):P\in\mathbb{Z}[z_1,\dots,z_n]\bigr\},$$
and the union ${L}_\infty = \bigcup^\infty_{n=1}L_n$. He made the far-reaching conjecture that the set of ${L}_\infty$ is a closed subset of $\mathbb R$. An immediate consequence of this conjecture would be the truth of Lehmer's conjecture, albeit without an explicit lower bound. As Smyth's result suggests that $L_1\subsetneqq L_2$ , Boyd further conjectures that
$$L_1\subsetneqq L_2\subsetneqq L_3\subsetneqq\ \cdots .$$

=== Mahler measure and entropy ===
An action $\alpha_M$ of $\mathbb{Z}^n$ by automorphisms of a compact metrizable abelian group may be associated via duality to any countable module $N$ over the ring $R=\mathbb{Z}[z_1^{\pm1},\dots,z_n^{\pm1}]$. The topological entropy (which is equal to the measure-theoretic entropy) of this action, $h(\alpha_N)$, is given by a Mahler measure (or is infinite). In the case of a cyclic module $M=R/\langle F\rangle$ for a non-zero polynomial $F(z_1,\dots,z_n)\in\mathbb{Z}[z_1,\ldots,z_n]$ the formula proved by Lind, Schmidt, and Ward gives $h(\alpha_N)=\log M(F)$, the logarithmic Mahler measure of $F$. In the general case, the entropy of the action is expressed as a sum of logarithmic Mahler measures over the generators of the principal associated prime ideals of the module. As pointed out earlier by Lind in the case $n=1$ of a single compact group automorphism, this means that the set of possible values of the entropy of such actions is either all of $[0,\infty]$ or a countable set depending on the solution to Lehmer's problem. Lind also showed that the infinite-dimensional torus $\mathbb{T}^{\infty}$ either has ergodic automorphisms of finite positive entropy or only has automorphisms of infinite entropy depending on the solution to Lehmer's problem.

== See also ==
- Bombieri norm
- Height of a polynomial
