= Supergolden ratio =

Number, approximately 1.46557

- A supergolden rectangle contains three scaled copies of itself, ψ = ψ^{−1} + 2ψ^{−3} + ψ^{−5}
- Rationality: irrational algebraic
- Symbol: ψ

Representations
- Decimal: 1.46557123187676802665...
- Algebraic form: real root of x^{3} = x^{2} + 1
- Continued fraction (linear): [1;2,6,1,3,5,4,22,1,1,4,1,2,84,...] not periodic infinite

In mathematics, the supergolden ratio is a geometrical proportion, given by the unique real solution of the equation x^{3} = x^{2} + 1. Its decimal expansion begins with 1.465571231876768... (sequence A092526 in the OEIS).

The name supergolden ratio is by analogy with the golden ratio, the positive solution of the equation x^{2} = x + 1.

== Definition ==
ψ = a/b = (a+c)/a = b/c. For b = 1 the boxes have volumes ψ^{3} = ψ^{2} (red) + 1 (green).

Three quantities a > b > c > 0 are in the supergolden ratio if
$$\frac{a+c}{a}=\frac{a}{b}=\frac{b}{c}$$
This common ratio is commonly denoted $\psi.$

Substituting $b=\psi c$ and $a=\psi b =\psi^2 c$ in the first fraction,
$$\psi =\frac{c(\psi^2 +1)}{\psi^2 c}.$$
It follows that the supergolden ratio is the unique real solution of the cubic equation $\psi^3 -\psi^2 -1 =0$.

The minimal polynomial for the reciprocal root is the depressed cubic $x^3 +x -1$, thus the simplest solution with Cardano's formula,
$$\begin{align}
w_{1,2} &=\left( 1 \pm \frac{1}{3} \sqrt{ \frac{31}{3}} \right) /2 \\
1 /\psi &=\sqrt[3]{w_1} +\sqrt[3]{w_2} \end{align}$$

or, using the hyperbolic sine,
$$1 /\psi =\frac{2}{ \sqrt{3}} \sinh \left( \frac{1}{3} \operatorname{arsinh} \left( \frac{3 \sqrt{3}}{2} \right) \right).$$

$1 /\psi$ is the superstable fixed point of the Newton's method iteration $x \to (2x^3 +1) /(3x^2 +1)$.

Dividing the defining trinomial $x^3 -x^2 -1$ by $x -\psi$ one obtains $x^2 +x /\psi^2 +1 /\psi$, and the conjugate elements of $\psi$ are
$$x_{1,2} = \left( -1 \pm i \sqrt{4 \psi^2 + 3} \right) /2 \psi^2 ,$$
with $x_1 +x_2 = 1 -\psi$ and $x_1x_2 =1 /\psi$.

The minimal polynomial of $2 /\psi$ is $f:x^3 +4x -8$. Multiply $f$ by $x$, and rearrange the relation as $(x^2 +2)^2 =8x +4.$ This results in the iteration $\, x_{n+1} \to \sqrt{-2 +2\sqrt{ 1 +2x_n \phantom{|} }},$ with initial value $x_0 >0$, and the infinite radical
$$2 /\psi =\sqrt{-2 +2\sqrt{1 +2\sqrt{-2 +2\sqrt{1 +2\cdots \phantom{|} }}}}$$

Its counterpart is found by using polynomial $g:y^3 +y^2 -y -9$, which has real zero $2\psi -1$. Multiply $g$ by $y-1$, then $(y^2 -1)^2 =8y -8,$ and the corresponding iteration with $y_0 >1$ gives
$$2\psi -1 =\sqrt{1 +2\sqrt{-2 +2\sqrt{1 +2\sqrt{-2 +2\cdots \phantom{|} }}}}$$

=== Supergolden dynamics ===
Orbit portrait of the map z → ( 3 − 2z^{2})/(z^{2} − 1) with fixed point z_{f} = ψ^{2} − 1. Viewport width [−8,8].

Orbit portrait of the map r → ( 9 − r^{2})/(r^{2} − 6) with fixed point r_{f} = ψ^{4} − 2. Viewport width [−5,5].

Each point on the dynamical plane is colored according to its phase in the limit cycle, with field lines added. Critical point 0, the negative pole is marked by a tiny cross, the circle is centred at the real fixed point.

Both systems have linear rate of convergence $\,\log_{10} \tfrac{2(2\psi -1)}{\psi} =0.420 \ldots$ This constant can be improved to $\,\log_{10} 2\psi^4 (\psi +1) =1.356 \ldots$ by using equation $z^3 =z(1-2z) +3 \,$ with real root $\psi^2 -1,$ numerically 1.147899... Divide both sides by $z$, and substitute $1 /(\psi^2 +1) =1 /(z+2) \,$ for $\, 3/z -2z$. This gives the iteration $\, z_{n+1} \to \sqrt{1 +\frac{1}{2 +z_n}},$ and the continued reciprocal square root
$$\psi^2 -1=\sqrt{1 +\cfrac{1}{2+\sqrt{1 +\cfrac{1}{2+\sqrt{1 +\cfrac{1}{2 +\ddots}}}}}}$$

The counterpart of this system, with equal convergence rate, is derived from $r^3 =r(6-r) +9 \,$ with real root $\psi^4 -2$. Divide both sides by $r$, and substitute $3 /(\psi^4 -1) =3 /(r+1) \,$ for $\, 9/r -r$, resulting in the iteration $r_{n+1} \to \sqrt{6 +\frac{3}{1 +r_n}}.$

If the principal root is chosen at each step, the sequences converge for all complex initial points other than the poles. By contrast, visualizations of the backward iterations
$$\begin{align}
z_{n-1} &\to \frac{1}{z^2_n -1} -2 \\
r_{n-1} &\to \frac{3}{r^2_n -6} -1 \end{align}$$
reveal intricate dynamics. Each has a single attracting, real five-point limit cycle with positive points $z_p =8.689909 \ldots \,$ and $\, r_p =0.345228 \ldots$, (Note: Roots of degree 30 equations.) and common multiplier $\lambda =-0.959298 \ldots$ The repelling, real fixed points $z_f =\psi^2 -1 \,$ and $\, r_f =3 /z_f$ have four preimages on the negative real axis. These are located at the cusps of the respective colored sections, each with a periodic point close in tow. The fifth preimage is the purely imaginary pair that mirrors the real fixed point and its negative, with approximate values $z_i \approx \pm 3.153775 i \,$ and $\, r_i =3 /z_i$. (Note: The squares of these are roots of degree 24 equations.)

The spirals issuing from the negative real axis are centred at the complex fixed points
$$\begin{align}
z_{1,2} &=\left( -\psi^3 \pm \frac{i}{\psi^3} \sqrt{3\psi +1} \right) /2 \\
r_{1,2} &=(\psi^2 -1) \, z_{1,2} \end{align}$$
with
$$\begin{align}
z_1 z_2 &=3 /(\psi^2 -1) \\
r_1 r_2 &=3(\psi^2 -1).\end{align}$$
The outward winding iterates in the neighborhood of these fixed points trace a logarithmic spiral with parameter $k =\ln(\rho) /\theta =\pm 0.0223 \ldots$ Modulus $\rho =\sqrt{ \tfrac{12}{\psi^4 (\psi +1)} }$ and argument $\theta \approx \pm 0.381\pi \,$ are given by the complex derivatives. In accordance with the periodicity of the systems, the inclination $\theta$ of the tangent ray tends toward $2\pi /5$.

== Properties ==
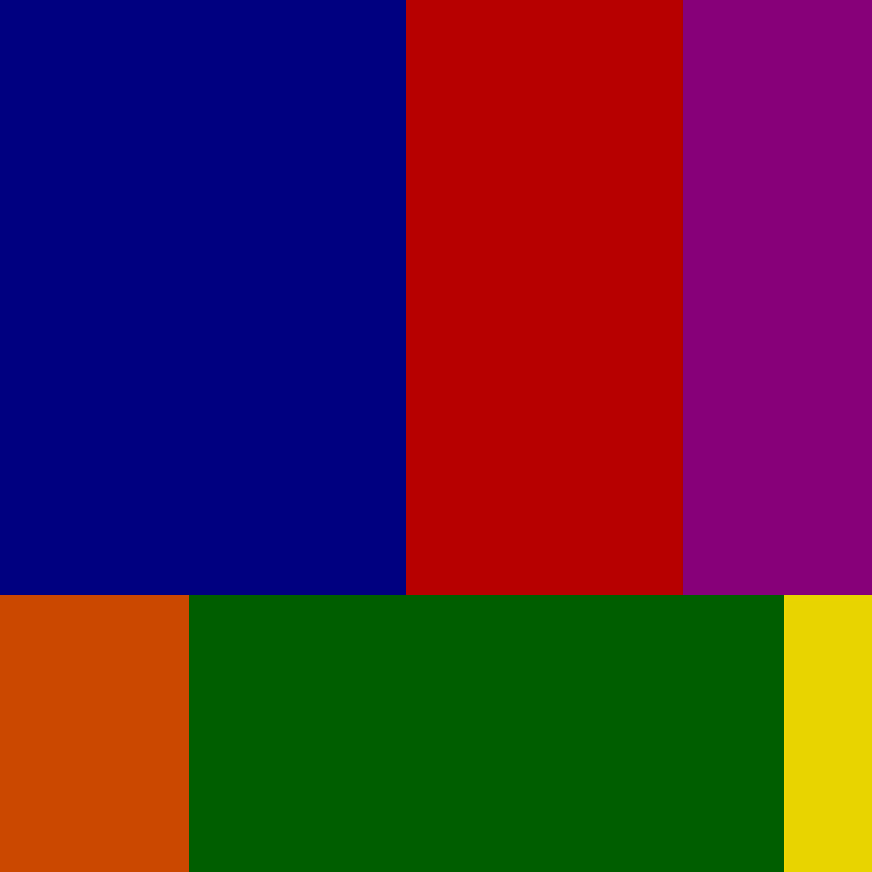
Rectangles in aspect ratios ψ, ψ^{2} and ψ^{3} (from left to right) tile the square.

The supergolden ratio can be expressed in terms of itself in many different ways, for example as fractions
$$\begin{align}
\psi^2 -1 &=\frac{2 -\psi}{\psi -1} =\frac{\psi^7 +1}{\psi^7 -1} \\
\frac{3}{2\psi -1} &=\frac{\psi^4 +1}{\psi^4 -1} \\
2\psi -1 &=\frac{\psi^3 +1}{\psi^3 -1} \\
\psi^4 -2 &=\frac{3}{\psi^2 -1} \\
\frac{\psi}{2 -\psi} &=\frac{\psi^2 +1}{\psi^2 -1} \\
\psi^2 +1 &=\frac{\psi}{\psi -1} \\
\psi^4 &=\frac{\psi +1}{2 -\psi} \\
2\psi^2 +1 &=\frac{\psi +1}{\psi -1} =2\psi^3 -1.\end{align}$$

Similarly as infinite geometric series
$$\begin{align}
\psi^3 &=\sum_{n=0}^{\infty} \psi^{-n} \\
\frac{\psi^2}{\psi^2 -1} &=\sum_{n=0}^{\infty} \psi^{-2n} \\
\psi &=\sum_{n=0}^{\infty} \psi^{-3n} \\
\frac{\psi}{\psi^2 -1} &=\sum_{n=0}^{\infty} \psi^{-4n} \\
\frac{1}{3 -\psi^2} &=\sum_{n=0}^{\infty} \psi^{-5n} \\
\frac{1}{\psi^2 -1} +\frac{1}{\psi^2 +2} &=\sum_{n=0}^{\infty} \psi^{-6n} \\
\frac{\psi^2}{2} &=\sum_{n=0}^{\infty} \psi^{-7n}.\end{align}$$
Additionally, $\sum_{n=0}^{7} \psi^{-n} = 3.$

For every integer $n$ one has
$$\begin{align}
\psi^n &=\psi^{n-1} +\psi^{n-3} \\
&=\psi^{n-2} +\psi^{n-3} +\psi^{n-4} \\
&=\psi^{n-2} +2\psi^{n-4} +\psi^{n-6}
\end{align}$$
from this an infinite number of further relations can be found.

Argument $\theta =\arcsec(2\psi^{4})$ satisfies the identity $\tan(\theta) -4\sin(\theta) =3\sqrt{3}$.

Continued fraction pattern of a few low powers
$$\begin{align}
\psi^{-1} &=[0;1,2,6,1,3,5,4,22,...] \approx 0.6823 \;(\tfrac{13}{19}) \\
\psi^0 &=[1] \\
\psi^1 &=[1;2,6,1,3,5,4,22,1,...] \approx 1.4656 \;(\tfrac{22}{15}) \\
\psi^2 &=[2;6,1,3,5,4,22,1,1,...] \approx 2.1479 \;(\tfrac{15}{7}) \\
\psi^3 &=[3;6,1,3,5,4,22,1,1,...] \approx 3.1479 \;(\tfrac{22}{7}) \\
\psi^4 &=[4;1,1,1,1,2,2,1,2,2,...] \approx 4.6135 \;(\tfrac{60}{13}) \\
\psi^5 &=[6;1,3,5,4,22,1,1,4,...] \approx 6.7614 \;(\tfrac{115}{17})
\end{align}$$

Notably, the continued fraction of $\psi^2$ begins as permutation of the first six natural numbers; the next term is equal to their sum + 1.

As derived from its continued fraction expansion, the simplest rational approximations of $\psi$ are:
$$\tfrac{3}{2},\tfrac{19}{13},\tfrac{22}{15},\tfrac{85}{58},\tfrac{277}{189},\tfrac{447}{305},\tfrac{1873}{1278},\tfrac{41653}{28421},\tfrac{43526}{29699},\tfrac{85179}{58120}, \ldots$$

Newton's method for p(z) = z^{3} − z^{2} − 1: ψ (right) and its complex conjugates at the nuclei of their basins of attraction. Julia set of the Newton map in orange, with unit circle and real curve for reference.

The supergolden ratio is the fourth smallest Pisot number. By definition of these numbers, the absolute value $1 /\sqrt{\psi}$ of the algebraic conjugates is smaller than 1, thus powers of $\psi$ generate almost integers. For example: $\psi^{11} =67.000222765...$ $\approx 67 +1/4489$. After eleven rotation steps the phases of the inward spiraling conjugate pair – initially close to $\pm 13 \pi/22$ – nearly align with the imaginary axis.

The minimal polynomial of the supergolden ratio $m(x) =x^3 -x^2 -1$ has discriminant $\Delta=-31 .$ The Hilbert class field of imaginary quadratic field $K = \mathbb{Q}( \sqrt{\Delta})$ can be formed by adjoining $\psi.$ With argument $\tau=(1 +\sqrt{\Delta})/2\,$ a generator for the ring of integers of $K$, one has the special value of Dedekind eta quotient
$$\psi =\frac{ e^{\pi i/24}\,\eta(\tau)}{ \sqrt{2}\,\eta(2\tau)}.$$

Expressed in terms of the Weber-Ramanujan class invariant G_{n} (Note: German Wikipedia has a table of analytical values of the Ramanujan G-function for odd arguments below 47.)
$$\psi =\frac{ \mathfrak{f} ( \sqrt{ \Delta} )}{ \sqrt{2} } =\frac{ G_{31} }{ \sqrt[4]{2} }.$$

Properties of the related Klein j-invariant $j(\tau)$ result in near identity $e^{\pi \sqrt{- \Delta}} \approx \left( \sqrt{2}\,\psi \right)^{24} - 24 .$ The difference is < 1/143092.

The elliptic integral singular value $k_{r} =\lambda^{*}(r)$ for $r=31$ has closed form expression
$$\lambda^{*}(31) =\sin ( \arcsin \left( ( \sqrt[4]{2}\,\psi)^{-12} \right) /2)$$
(which is less than 1/10 the eccentricity of the orbit of Venus).

== Narayana sequence ==
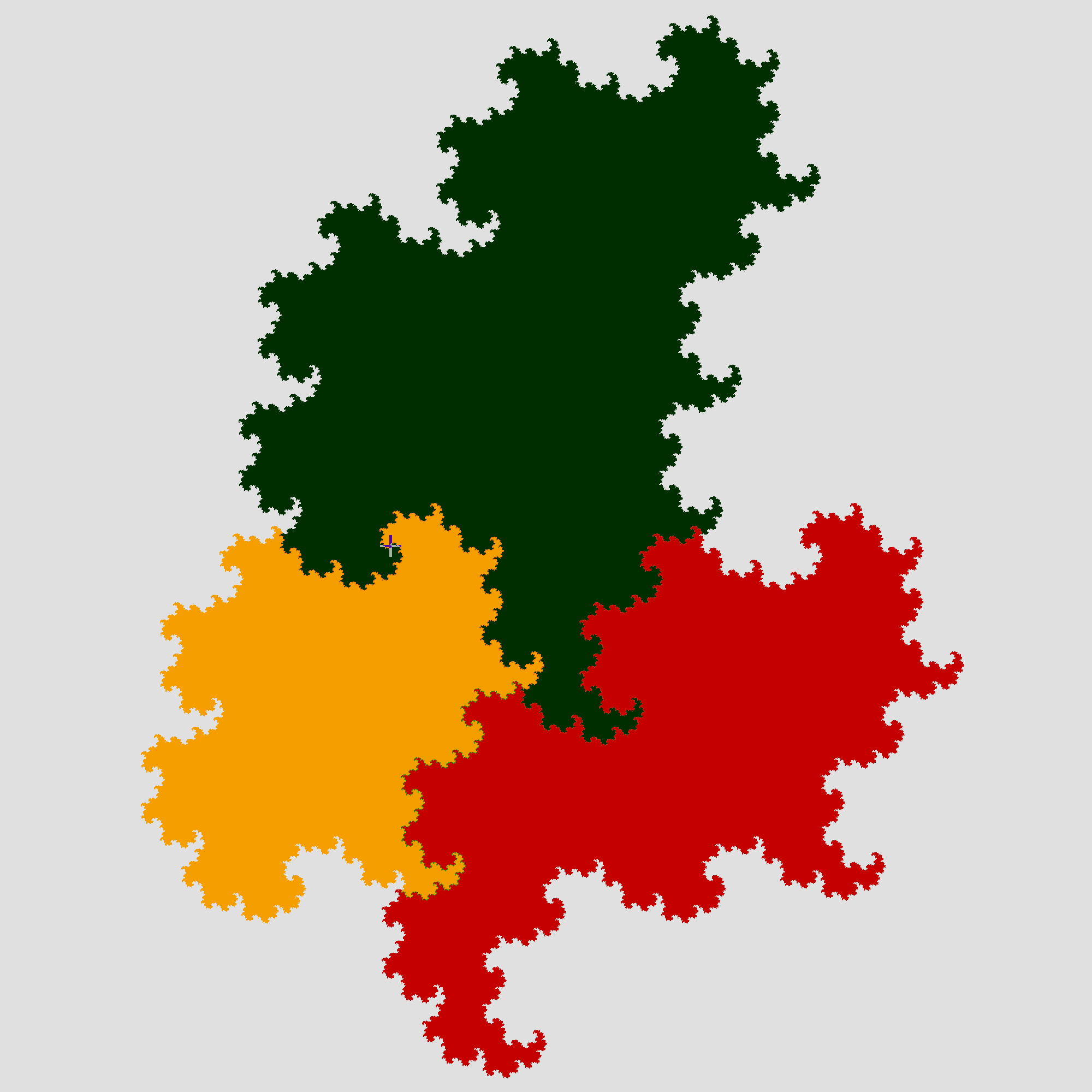
A Rauzy fractal associated with the supergolden ratio-cubed. The central tile and its three subtiles have areas in the ratios ψ^{4} : ψ^{2} : ψ : 1.

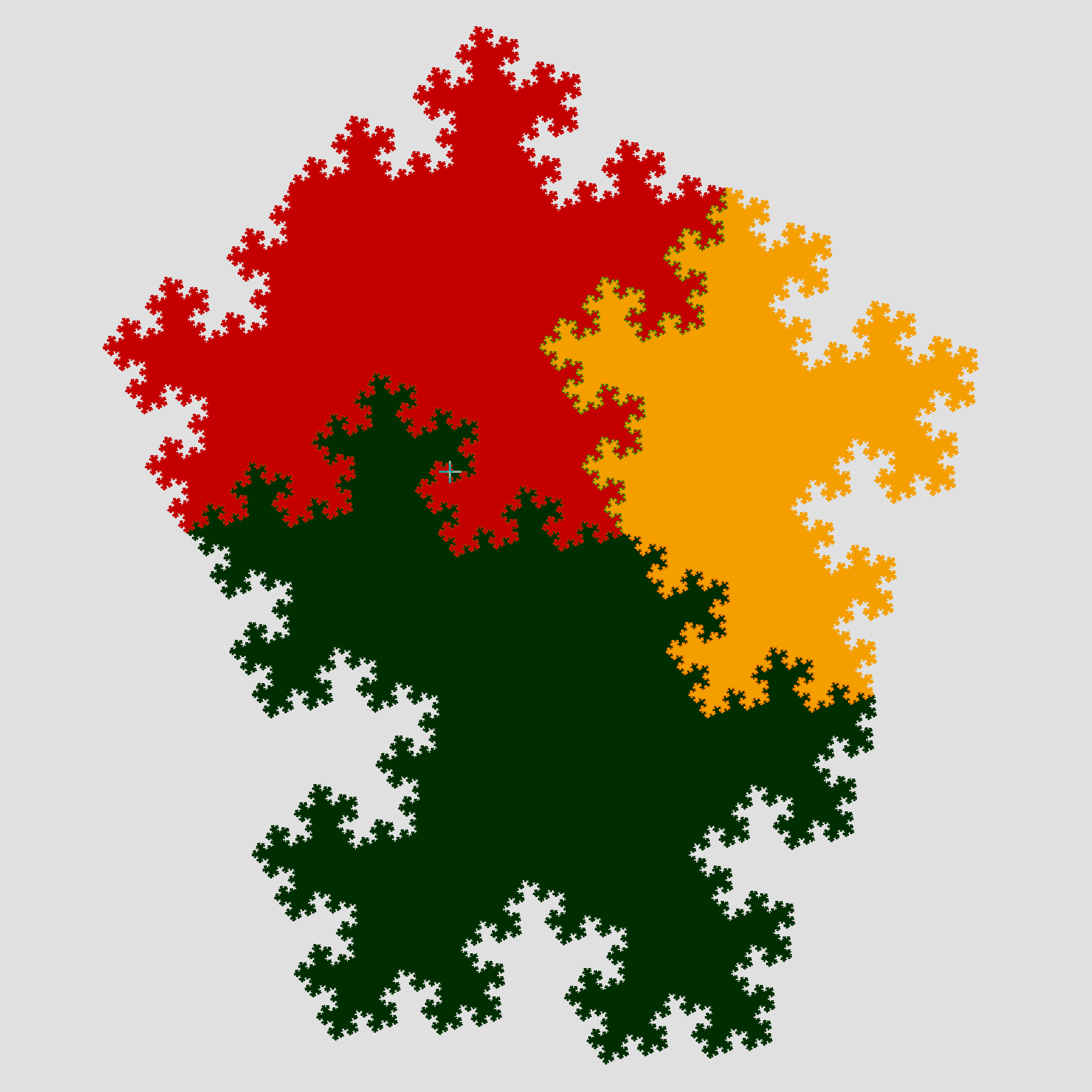
A Rauzy fractal associated with the supergolden ratio-squared, with areas as above.

Narayana's cows is a recurrence sequence originating from a problem proposed by the 14th century Indian mathematician Narayana Pandita. He asked for the number of cows and calves in a herd after 20 years, beginning with one cow in the first year, where each cow gives birth to one calf each year from the age of three onwards.

The Narayana sequence has a close connection to the Fibonacci and Padovan sequences and plays an important role in data coding, cryptography and combinatorics. The number of compositions of n into parts 1 and 3 is counted by the nth Narayana number.

The Narayana sequence is defined by the third-order recurrence relation
$$N_n =N_{n-1} +N_{n-3} \text{ for } n >2,$$
with initial values
$$N_0 =N_1 =N_2 =1.$$

The first few terms are 1, 1, 1, 2, 3, 4, 6, 9, 13, 19, 28, 41, 60, 88,... (sequence A000930 in the OEIS). The limit ratio between consecutive terms is the supergolden ratio:$\lim_{n\rightarrow \infty} N_{n+1}/N_n =\psi.$

The generating function of the Narayana sequence is
$$\frac{1}{1 -x -x^3} =\sum_{n=0}^{\infty} N_n x^n \text{ for } x <\tfrac{1}{\psi}$$

Taking the sum of the first $n$ terms gives
$$N_{n+2} -1 =\sum_{k=0}^{n-1} {N_k}$$

Expressing the terms as sums of binomial coefficients
$$N_n =\sum_{k=0}^{\lfloor n / 3 \rfloor}{n-2k \choose k}$$

The sequence is extended to negative indices using
$$N_n =N_{n+3} -N_{n+2},$$
obtaining (1), 0, 0, 1, 0,−1, 1, 1,−2, 0, 3,−2,−3, 5,... (sequence A077961 in the OEIS).

Powers of the supergolden ratio can be written with Narayana numbers as quadratic coefficients
$$\psi^n =\psi^2 N_{n-2} +\psi N_{n-4} +N_{n-3},$$
which is proved by mathematical induction on $n.$ This relation also holds for $n < 0.$ The order of the coefficients corresponds to the bottom row of matrix $Q$ below.

The characteristic equation of the recurrence is $x^3 -x^2 -1 =0 .$ If the three solutions are real root $\psi$ and conjugate pair $\beta$ and $\gamma$, the Narayana numbers are given by the Binet formula
$$N_{n-1} =a \psi^n +b \beta^n +c \gamma^n ,$$
with real $a$ and conjugates $b$ and $c$ the roots of $31x^3 -3x -1 =0.$

Since $\left\vert b \beta^n +c \gamma^n \right\vert < \psi^{-n/2}$, the number $N_n$ is the nearest integer to $\,a\,\psi^{n+1}$, with $n \ge 0$ and coefficient $a =\psi^2 /(\psi^3 +2) =$ 0.4172379879262187776214755...

Coefficients $a =b =c =1$ result in the Binet formula for the related sequence $A_n =N_n +2N_{n-3} .$

The first few terms are 3, 1, 1, 4, 5, 6, 10, 15, 21, 31, 46, 67, 98, 144,... (sequence A001609 in the OEIS).

This anonymous sequence has the Fermat property: if p is prime, $A_{p} \equiv A_1 \bmod p .$ The converse does not hold, but the small number of odd pseudoprimes $\,n \mid (A_n -1)$ makes the sequence special. The 8 odd composite numbers below 10^{8} to pass the test are n = 1155, 552599, 2722611, 4822081, 10479787, 10620331, 16910355, 66342673.

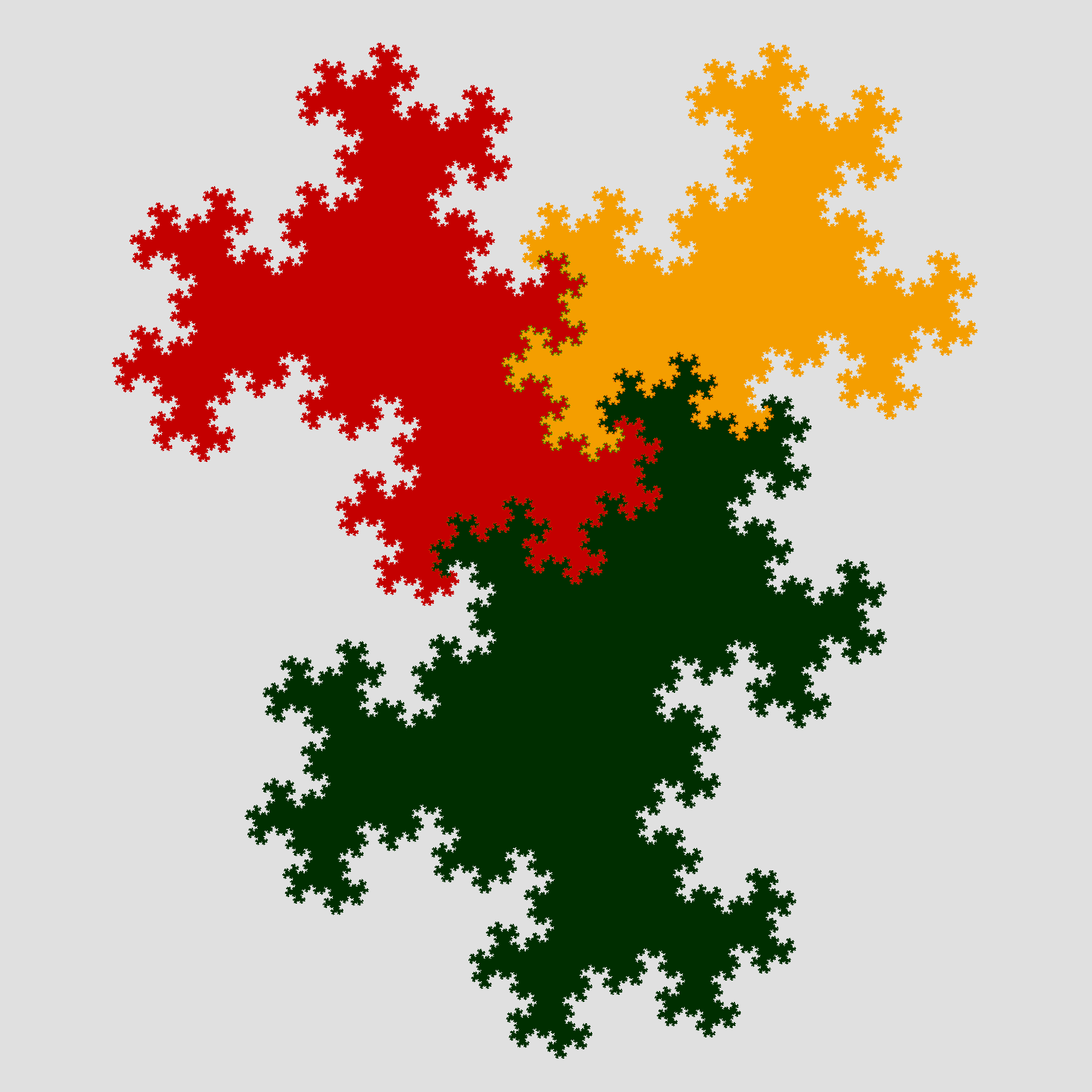
A supergolden Rauzy fractal of type a ↦ ab, with areas as above. The fractal boundary has box-counting dimension 1.50

The Narayana numbers are obtained as integral powers n > 3 of a matrix with real eigenvalue $\psi$
$$Q = \begin{pmatrix} 1 & 0 & 1 \\ 1 & 0 & 0 \\ 0 & 1 & 0 \end{pmatrix} ,$$

$$Q^n =\begin{pmatrix} N_n & N_{n-2} & N_{n-1} \\ N_{n-1} & N_{n-3} & N_{n-2} \\ N_{n-2} & N_{n-4} & N_{n-3} \end{pmatrix}$$

The trace of $Q^n$ gives the above $A_n$.

Alternatively, $Q$ can be interpreted as incidence matrix for a D0L Lindenmayer system on the alphabet $\{a,b,c\}$ with corresponding substitution rule
$$\begin{cases}
a \;\mapsto \;ab \\
b \;\mapsto \;c \\
c \;\mapsto \;a \end{cases}$$
and initiator $w_0=b$. The series of words $w_n$ produced by iterating the substitution have lengths $l(w_n) =N_n$. The number of c, b and a's in each word is equal to successive Narayana numbers. Associated to this string rewriting process is a compact set composed of self-similar tiles called the Rauzy fractal, that visualizes the combinatorial information contained in a multiple-generation three-letter sequence.

The ratio between the number of digits in successive strings for the binary version of the look-and-say sequence converges to $\psi$.

== Geometry ==
=== Supergolden triangle ===
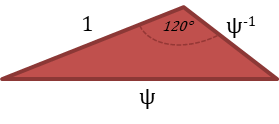
Supergolden triangle with area √3/4ψ .

A triangle with sides $a < b < c$ in common ratio $\tfrac{a}{c -b} =\tfrac{b}{a} =\tfrac{c}{b} =\psi \,$ has an angle of 120 degrees. With $c =\psi$, the cosine of the obtuse angle is $\cos \gamma =\frac{\psi^{-2} +1 -\psi^2}{2\psi^{-1} }.$ Since $\psi^2 -\psi^{-2} =1 + \psi^{-1},$ this reduces to $\, \gamma =\arccos \tfrac{-1}{2} =\tfrac23 \pi.$

=== Psi-quad substitution tiling ===
Psi-quad substitution tiling.

Supergolden fractal triangle.

In the complex plane, if $\psi$ is a non-real root of $\psi^3 -\psi^2 -1 =0$, then the vertices of a self-similar quadrilateral tiling (the psi-quad substitution tiling) can be taken as the six points $\psi^0, \psi^1, \psi^2, \psi^3, \psi^4, -\psi^2$. The iterated boundary is the supergolden fractal triangle, which has Hausdorff dimension $d_{\partial} =\frac{2 \log \zeta}{\log \psi}$, where $\zeta$ is the real root of $\zeta^7 -2\zeta^2 -1 =0$, so numerically $d_{\partial} \approx 1.0295240599$.

=== Supergolden rectangle ===
Nested supergolden rectangles with perpendicular diagonals and side lengths in powers of ψ.

A supergolden rectangle is a rectangle whose side lengths are in a $\psi:1$ ratio. Compared to the golden rectangle, the supergolden rectangle has one more degree of self-similarity.

Given a rectangle of height 1, length $\psi$ and diagonal length $\sqrt{\psi^3}$ (according to $1 +\psi^2 =\psi^3$). The triangles on the diagonal have altitudes $1 /\sqrt{\psi}\,;$ each perpendicular foot divides the diagonal in ratio $\psi^2$.

On the left-hand side, cut off a square of side length 1 and mark the intersection with the falling diagonal. The remaining rectangle now has aspect ratio $\psi^2 :1$ (according to $\psi -1 =\psi^{-2}$). Divide the original rectangle into four parts by a second, horizontal cut passing through the intersection point.

The rectangle below the diagonal has aspect ratio $\psi^3$, the other three are all supergolden rectangles, with a fourth one between the feet of the altitudes. The parent rectangle and the four scaled copies have linear sizes in the ratios $\psi^3 :\psi^2 :\psi :\psi^2 -1 :1.$ It follows from the theorem of the gnomon that the areas of the two rectangles opposite the diagonal are equal.

In the supergolden rectangle above the diagonal, the process is repeated at a scale of $1:\psi^2$.

=== Supergolden spiral ===
Supergolden spirals with different initial radii on a ψ− rectangle.

A supergolden spiral is a logarithmic spiral that gets wider by a factor of $\psi$ for every quarter turn. It is described by the polar equation $r( \theta) =a \exp(k \theta),$ with initial radius $a$ and parameter $k =\frac{2}{\pi} \ln( \psi).$ If drawn on a supergolden rectangle, the spiral has its pole at the foot of altitude of a triangle on the diagonal and passes through vertices of rectangles with aspect ratio $\psi$ which are perpendicularly aligned and successively scaled by a factor $\psi^{-1}.$

== See also ==
Solutions of equations similar to $x^3 =x^2 +1$:

- Golden ratio – the positive solution of the equation $x^2 =x +1$
- Plastic ratio – the real solution of the equation $x^3 =x +1$
- Supersilver ratio – the real solution of the equation $x^3 =2x^2 +1$
