= Perron number =

Type of algebraic number

In mathematics, a Perron number is an algebraic integer α which is real and greater than 1, but such that its conjugate elements are all less than α in absolute value. For example, the larger of the two roots of the irreducible polynomial $x^2 - 3x + 1$ is a Perron number.

Perron numbers are named after Oskar Perron; the Perron–Frobenius theorem asserts that, for a real square matrix with positive algebraic entries whose largest eigenvalue is greater than one, this eigenvalue is a Perron number. (Conversely, it was shown in the late 20th century by Douglas Lind that the Perron numbers are in fact the "closure" of the natural numbers, realized after only one iteration of taking spectral radii of aperiodic matrices, where entries are drawn from this set.) As a closely related case, the Perron number of a graph is defined to be the spectral radius of its adjacency matrix.

Any Pisot number or Salem number is a Perron number, as is the Mahler measure of a monic integer polynomial.
