= Tirukkannapuram Vijayaraghavan =

Indian mathematician (1902–1955)

Thirukannapuram Vijayaraghavan
- Born: 30 November 1902
- Died: 20 April 1955 (aged 52)
- Occupation: mathematician

Tirukkannapuram Vijayaraghavan (Tamil: திருக்கண்ணபுரம் விஜயராகவன்; 30 November 1902 – 20 April 1955) was an Indian mathematician from the Madras region. He worked with G. H. Hardy on Pisot–Vijayaraghavan numbers when he went to Oxford in the mid-1920s. He was a fellow of Indian Academy of Sciences elected in 1934. His father was a pandit.

Vijayaraghavan was well-versed in Sanskrit and Tamil. He was a close friend of André Weil. Weil hired him in 1930 despite his lack of diploma, and they served together in Aligarh Muslim University. While Weil was away in Europe, Ross Masood planned to replace Weil's professorship with Vijayaraghavan, but Vijayaraghavan quit in protest and moved to the University of Dhaka.

Vijayaraghavan proved a special case of Herschfeld's theorem on nested radicals: For $a_n>0$

$$\sqrt{a_1 + \sqrt{a_2 + \sqrt{a_3 + \sqrt{a_4 + \cdots}}}}$$

converges if and only if

$$\overline{\lim} (\log a_n)/2^n < +\infty,$$

where $\overline{\lim}$ denotes the limit superior.
