= Pisot–Vijayaraghavan number =

Type of algebraic integer

In mathematics, a Pisot–Vijayaraghavan number (or Pisot number or PV number) is a real algebraic integer greater than 1, all of whose Galois conjugates are less than 1 in absolute value. These numbers were discovered by Axel Thue in 1912 and rediscovered by G. H. Hardy in 1919 within the context of Diophantine approximation. They became widely known after the publication of Charles Pisot's dissertation in 1938. They also occur in the uniqueness problem for Fourier series. Tirukkannapuram Vijayaraghavan and Raphael Salem continued their study in the 1940s. Salem numbers are a closely related set of numbers.

A characteristic property of PV numbers is that their powers approach integers at an exponential rate. Pisot proved a remarkable converse: if α > 1 is a real number such that the sequence

$$\|\alpha^n\|$$

measuring the distance from its consecutive powers to the nearest integer is square-summable, or ℓ^{2}, then α is a Pisot number (and, in particular, algebraic). Building on this characterization of PV numbers, Salem showed that the set S of all PV numbers is closed. Its minimal element is a cubic irrationality known as the plastic ratio. Much is known about the accumulation points of S. The smallest of them is the golden ratio.

== Definition and properties ==
Newton's method for p(z) = z^{4} − z^{3} − 1. The second Pisot number χ (right) and its conjugates at the nuclei of their basins of attraction in the complex plane. Julia set of the Newton map in orange, with unit circle and real curve for reference.

An algebraic integer of degree n is a root α of an irreducible monic polynomial P(x) of degree n with integer coefficients, its minimal polynomial. The other roots of P(x) are called the conjugates of α. If α > 1 but all other roots of P(x) are real or complex numbers of absolute value less than 1, so that they lie strictly inside the unit circle in the complex plane, then α is called a Pisot number, Pisot–Vijayaraghavan number, or simply PV number. For example, the golden ratio, φ ≈ 1.618, is a real quadratic integer that is greater than 1, while the absolute value of its conjugate, −φ^{−1} ≈ −0.618, is less than 1. Therefore, φ is a Pisot number. Its minimal polynomial is x^{2} − x − 1.

=== Elementary properties ===
- Every integer greater than 1 is a PV number. Conversely, every rational PV number is an integer greater than 1.
- If α is an irrational PV number whose minimal polynomial ends in k then α is greater than |k|.
- If α is a PV number then so are its powers α^{k}, for all positive integer exponents k.
- Every real algebraic number field K of degree n contains a PV number of degree n. This number is a field generator. The set of all PV numbers of degree n in K is closed under multiplication.
- Given an upper bound M and degree n, there are only finitely many PV numbers of degree n that are less than M.
- Every PV number is a Perron number (a real algebraic number greater than one all of whose conjugates have smaller absolute value).

=== Diophantine properties ===
The main interest in PV numbers is due to the fact that their powers have a very "biased" distribution (mod 1). If α is a PV number and λ is any algebraic integer in the field $\mathbb{Q}(\alpha)$ then the sequence

$$\|\lambda\alpha^n\|,$$

where ||x|| denotes the distance from the real number x to the nearest integer, approaches 0 at an exponential rate. In particular, it is a square-summable sequence and its terms converge to 0.

Two converse statements are known: they characterize PV numbers among all real numbers and among the algebraic numbers (but under a weaker Diophantine assumption).

- Suppose α is a real number greater than 1 and λ is a non-zero real number such that

$$\sum_{n=1}^\infty \|\lambda\alpha^n\|^2 < \infty.$$

Then α is a Pisot number and λ is an algebraic number in the field $\mathbb{Q}(\alpha)$ (Pisot's theorem).

- Suppose α is an algebraic number greater than 1 and λ is a non-zero real number such that

$$\|\lambda\alpha^n\| \to 0, \quad n\to\infty.$$

Then α is a Pisot number and λ is an algebraic number in the field $\mathbb{Q}(\alpha)$.

A longstanding Pisot–Vijayaraghavan problem asks whether the assumption that α is algebraic can be dropped from the last statement. If the answer is affirmative, Pisot's numbers would be characterized among all real numbers by the simple convergence of ||λα^{n}|| to 0 for some auxiliary real λ. It is known that there are only countably many numbers α with this property. The problem is to decide whether any of them is transcendental.

=== Topological properties ===
The set of all Pisot numbers is denoted S. Since Pisot numbers are algebraic, the set S is countable. Raphael Salem proved that this set is closed: it contains all its limit points. His proof uses a constructive version of the main diophantine property of Pisot numbers: given a Pisot number α, a real number λ can be chosen so that 0 < λ ≤ α and

$$\sum_{n=1}^\infty \|\lambda\alpha^n\|^2 \leq 9.$$

Thus the ℓ^{2} norm of the sequence ||λα^{n}|| can be bounded by a uniform constant independent of α. In the last step of the proof, Pisot's characterization is invoked to conclude that the limit of a sequence of Pisot numbers is itself a Pisot number.

Closedness of S implies that it has a minimal element. Carl Siegel proved that it is the positive root of the equation x^{3} − x − 1 = 0 (plastic constant) and is isolated in S. He constructed two sequences of Pisot numbers converging to the golden ratio φ from below and asked whether φ is the smallest limit point of S. This was later proved by Dufresnoy and Pisot, who also determined all elements of S that are less than φ; not all of them belong to Siegel's two sequences. Vijayaraghavan proved that S has infinitely many limit points; in fact, the sequence of derived sets

$$S, S', S'', \ldots$$

does not terminate. On the other hand, the intersection $S^{(\omega)}$ of these sets is empty, meaning that the Cantor–Bendixson rank of S is ω. Even more accurately, the order type of S has been determined: Let $a_0 = 1$, and for all n ≥ 1, define the order type

$$a_{n + 1} = a_n \omega + 1 + (a_n \omega)^*,$$

where ω is the order type of the natural numbers, a* means a in reverse order, and addition and multiplication are interpreted the same as for ordinal numbers. Then S has order type

$$\mathrm{ord}(S) = \sum_{n = 0}^\infty a_n.$$

The set of Salem numbers, denoted by T, is intimately related with S. It has been proved that S is contained in the set T' of the limit points of T. It has been conjectured that the union of S and T is closed.

== Quadratic irrationals ==
If $\alpha\,$ is a quadratic irrational there is only one other conjugate, $\alpha'$, obtained by changing the sign of the square root in $\alpha$ from

$$\alpha = a + \sqrt D \text{ to } \alpha' = a - \sqrt D\,$$

or from

$$\alpha = \frac{a +  \sqrt D}{2}\text{ to }\alpha' = \frac{a -  \sqrt D}{2}.\,$$

Here a and D are integers and in the second case a is odd and D is congruent to 1 modulo 4.

The required conditions are α > 1 and −1 < α' < 1. These are satisfied in the first case exactly when a > 0 and either $(a-1)^2 < D < a^2$ or $a^2 < D < (a+1)^2$, and are satisfied in the second case exactly when $a>0$ and either $(a-2)^2 < D < a^2$ or $a^2 < D < (a+2)^2$.

Thus, the first few quadratic irrationals that are PV numbers are:

Value	Root of...	Numerical value
$\frac{1+\sqrt{5}}{2}$	$x^2-x-1$	1.618033... OEIS: A001622 (the golden ratio)
$1+\sqrt{2}\,$	$x^2-2x-1$	2.414213... OEIS: A014176 (the silver ratio)
$\frac{3+\sqrt{5}}{2}$	$x^2-3x+1$	2.618033... OEIS: A104457 (the golden ratio squared)
$1+\sqrt{3}\,$	$x^2-2x-2$	2.732050... OEIS: A090388
$\frac{3+\sqrt{13}}{2}$	$x^2-3x-1$	3.302775... OEIS: A098316 (the third metallic mean)
$2+\sqrt{2}\,$	$x^2-4x+2$	3.414213...
$\frac{3+\sqrt{17}}{2}$	$x^2-3x-2$	3.561552.. OEIS: A178255.
$2+\sqrt{3}\,$	$x^2-4x+1$	3.732050... OEIS: A019973
$\frac{3+\sqrt{21}}{2}$	$x^2-3x-3$	3.791287...OEIS: A090458
$2+\sqrt{5}\,$	$x^2-4x-1$	4.236067... OEIS: A098317 (the fourth metallic mean)

== Powers of PV-numbers ==
Pisot–Vijayaraghavan numbers can be used to generate almost integers: the nth power of a Pisot number approaches integers as n grows. For example,

$(3+\sqrt{10})^6=27379+8658\sqrt{10}=54757.9999817\dots \approx 54758-\frac{1}{54758}.$

Since $27379 \,$ and $8658\sqrt{10} \,$ differ by only $0.0000182\dots,\,$

$$\frac{27379}{8658}=3.162277662\dots$$

is extremely close to

$$\sqrt{10}=3.162277660\dots .$$

Indeed

$$\left( \frac{27379}{8658}\right)^2=10+\frac{1}{8658^2}.$$

Higher powers give correspondingly better rational approximations.

This property stems from the fact that for each n, the sum of nth powers of an algebraic integer x and its conjugates is exactly an integer; this follows from an application of Newton's identities. When x is a Pisot number, the nth powers of the other conjugates tend to 0 as n tends to infinity. Since the sum is an integer, the distance from x^{n} to the nearest integer tends to 0 at an exponential rate.

== Small Pisot numbers ==
All Pisot numbers that do not exceed the golden ratio φ have been determined by Dufresnoy and Pisot. The table below lists ten smallest Pisot numbers in increasing order.

	Value	Root of...	Root of...
1	1.32471795724474602596... OEIS: A060006 (plastic ratio)	$x(x^2-x-1)+(x^2-1)$	$x^3-x-1$
2	1.38027756909761411567... OEIS: A086106	$x^2(x^2-x-1)+(x^2-1)$	$x^4-x^3-1$
3	1.44326879127037310762... OEIS: A228777	$x^3(x^2-x-1)+(x^2-1)$	$x^5-x^4-x^3+x^2-1$
4	1.46557123187676802665... OEIS: A092526 (supergolden ratio)	$x^3(x^2-x-1)+1$	$x^3-x^2-1$
5	1.50159480353908736637... OEIS: A293508	$x^4(x^2-x-1)+(x^2-1)$	$x^6-x^5-x^4+x^2-1$
6	1.53415774491426691543... OEIS: A293509	$x^4(x^2-x-1)+1$	$x^5-x^3-x^2-x-1$
7	1.54521564973275524325... OEIS: A293557	$x^5(x^2-x-1)+(x^2-1)$	$x^7-x^6-x^5+x^2-1$
8	1.56175206772029729470... OEIS: A374002	$x^3(x^3-2x^2+x-1)+(x-1)(x^2+1)$	$x^6-2x^5+x^4-x^2+x-1$
9	1.57014731219605436291... OEIS: A293506	$x^5(x^2-x-1)+1$	$x^5-x^4-x^2-1$
10	1.57367896839351698877... OEIS: A374003	$x^6(x^2-x-1)+(x^2-1)$	$x^8-x^7-x^6+x^2-1$

Since these PV numbers are less than 2, they are all units: their minimal polynomials end in 1 or −1. The polynomials in this table, with the exception of

$$x^6 - 2x^5 + x^4 - x^2 + x - 1,$$

are factors of either

$$x^n(x^2 - x - 1) + 1$$

or

$$x^n(x^2 - x - 1) + (x^2 - 1).$$

The first polynomial is divisible by x^{2} − 1 when n is odd and by x − 1 when n is even. It has one other real zero, which is a PV number. Dividing either polynomial by x^{n} gives expressions that approach x^{2} − x − 1 as n grows very large and have zeros that converge to φ. A complementary pair of polynomials,

$$x^n(x^2 - x - 1) - 1$$

and

$$x^n(x^2-x-1) - (x^2-1)\,$$

yields Pisot numbers that approach φ from above.

Two-dimensional turbulence modeling using logarithmic spiral chains with self-similarity defined by a constant scaling factor can be reproduced with some small Pisot numbers.
