= Plastic ratio =

Number, approximately 1.32472

- A spiral of rectangles in the plastic ratio.
- Rationality: irrational algebraic
- Symbol: ρ

Representations
- Decimal: 1.32471795724474602596...
- Algebraic form: real root of x^{3} = x + 1
- Continued fraction (linear): [1;3,12,1,1,3,2,3,2,4,2,141,80,...] not periodic infinite

In mathematics, the plastic ratio is a geometrical proportion, given by the unique real solution of the equation x^{3} = x + 1. Its decimal expansion begins with 1.324717957244746... (sequence A060006 in the OEIS). It is the smallest Pisot number.

The adjective plastic does not refer to the artificial material, but to the formative and sculptural qualities of this ratio, as in plastic arts.

== Definition ==
ρ = a/b = (b+c)/a = b/c. For b = 1 the boxes have volumes ρ^{3} = ρ (red) + 1 (green).

Three quantities a > b > c > 0 are in the plastic ratio if
$$\frac{b}{c} = \frac{a}{b} = \frac{b+c}{a}$$
This ratio is commonly denoted $\rho$ (rho).

Substituting $b=\rho c$ and $a=\rho b =\rho^2 c$ in the last fraction,
$$\rho =\frac{c(\rho+1)}{\rho^2 c}.$$
It follows that the plastic ratio is the unique real solution of the cubic equation $\rho^3 -\rho -1 =0.$

Solving with Cardano's formula,
$$\begin{align}
w_{1,2} &=\frac12 \left( 1 \pm \frac13 \sqrt{\frac{23}{3}} \right) \\
\rho &=\sqrt[3]{w_1} +\sqrt[3]{w_2} \end{align}$$
or, using the hyperbolic cosine,
$$\rho =\frac{2}{ \sqrt{3}} \cosh \left( \frac{1}{3} \operatorname{arcosh} \left( \frac{3 \sqrt{3}}{2} \right) \right).$$

Dividing the defining trinomial $x^3 -x -1$ by $x -\rho$ one obtains $x^2 +\rho x +1 /\rho$, and the conjugate elements of $\rho$ are
$$x_{1,2} =\left( -\rho \pm i \sqrt{3 \rho^2 - 4} \right) /2 ,$$
with $x_1 +x_2 =-\rho \;$ and $\; x_1x_2 =1 /\rho.$

Julia set (in black) of the map z → 1/(z^{2} − 1) with super-attracting limit set {0,−1,∞}. Pole z_{p} = −1 is marked by a cross, the tiny white circle is centred at repelling fixed point z_{f} = ρ. Viewport width [−2,2].

Writing $z^2 =1 +1 /z,$ the fixed-point iteration $z_{n+1} \to \sqrt{1 +\frac{1}{z_n}}$ results in the continued reciprocal square root
$$\rho =\sqrt{1 +\cfrac{1}{\sqrt{1 +\cfrac{1}{\sqrt{1 +\cfrac{1}{\ddots}}}}}}$$
The image shows the Julia set of the backward iteration $z_{n-1} \to \frac{1}{z^2_n -1}$ on the complex plane.

$\rho$ is the superstable fixed point of the Newton iteration $x \to (2x^3 +1) /(3x^2 -1)$. Its Julia set is found below.

== Properties ==
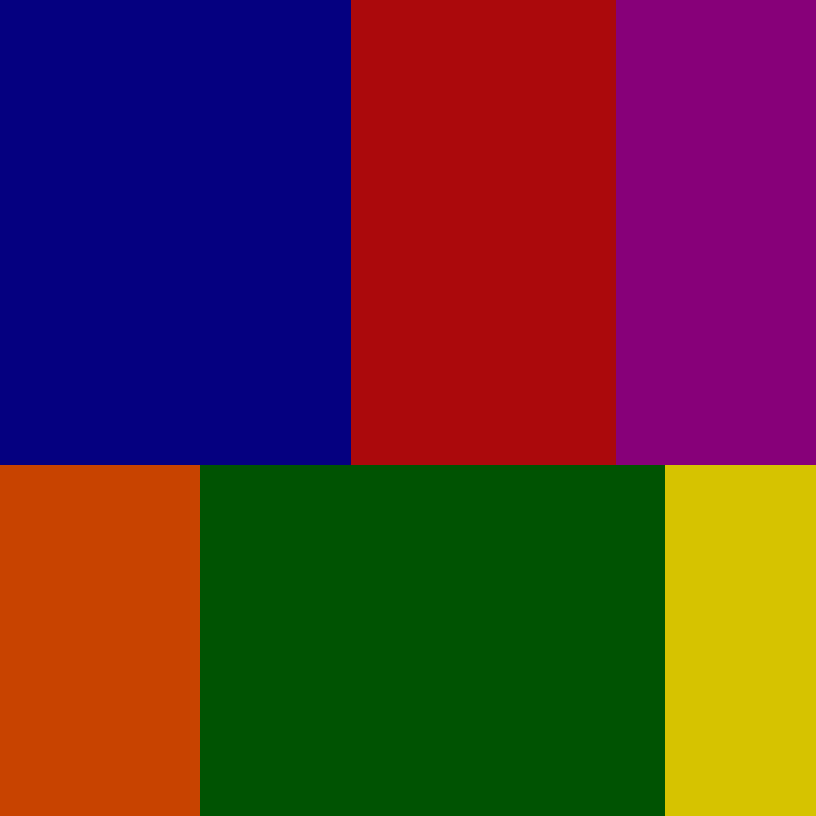
Rectangles in aspect ratios ρ, ρ^{2}, ρ^{3} (top) and ρ^{2}, ρ, ρ^{3} (bottom row) tile the square.

The plastic ratio $\rho$ and golden ratio $\varphi$ are the only morphic numbers: real numbers x > 1 for which there exist natural numbers m and n such that $x +1 =x^m$ and $\;x -1 =x^{-n}.$ Morphic numbers can serve as basis for a system of measure.

Properties of $\rho$ (m=3 and n=4) are related to those of $\varphi$ (m=2 and n=1). For example, The plastic ratio satisfies the continued radical
$$\rho =\sqrt[3]{1 +\sqrt[3]{1 +\sqrt[3]{\phantom{|} 1 +\cdots}}} ,$$
while the golden ratio satisfies the analogous
$$\varphi =\sqrt{1 +\sqrt{1 +\sqrt{\phantom{|} 1 +\cdots}}}$$

The plastic ratio can be expressed in terms of itself as the infinite geometric series
$$\begin{align}
\rho^5 &=\sum_{n=0}^{\infty} \rho^{-n} \\
\rho^3 &=\sum_{n=0}^{\infty} \rho^{-2n} \\
\rho^2 &=\sum_{n=0}^{\infty} \rho^{-3n} \\
\frac{\rho^5}{\rho^2 +1} &=\sum_{n=0}^{\infty} \rho^{-4n} \\
\rho &=\sum_{n=0}^{\infty} \rho^{-5n} \\
\frac{\rho^5}{\rho +2} &=\sum_{n=0}^{\infty} \rho^{-6n} \\
\frac{\rho^3}{2} &=\sum_{n=0}^{\infty} \rho^{-7n},\end{align}$$

Newton's method for p(z) = z^{3} − z − 1: ρ (right) and its complex conjugates at the nuclei of their basins of attraction. Julia set of the Newton map in orange, with unit circle and real curve for reference.

in comparison to the series for the golden ratio
$$\begin{align}
\varphi^2 &=\sum_{n=0}^{\infty} \varphi^{-n} \\
\varphi &=\sum_{n=0}^{\infty} \varphi^{-2n} \\
\frac{\varphi^2}{2} &=\sum_{n=0}^{\infty} \varphi^{-3n}.\end{align}$$
Additionally, $\sum_{n=0}^{13} \rho^{-n} =4,$ while $\sum_{n=0}^{2} \varphi^{-n} =2.$

For every integer $n$ one has
$$\begin{align}
\rho^n &=\rho^{n-2} +\rho^{n-3}\\
&=\rho^{n-1} +\rho^{n-5}\\
&=\rho^{n-3} +\rho^{n-4} +\rho^{n-5}
\end{align}$$
from this an infinite number of further relations can be found.

The algebraic solution of a reduced quintic equation can be written in terms of square roots, cube roots and the Bring radical. If $y =x^{5} +x$ then $x = BR(y).$ Since $\rho^{-5} +\rho^{-1} =1, \;\rho =1 /BR(1).$

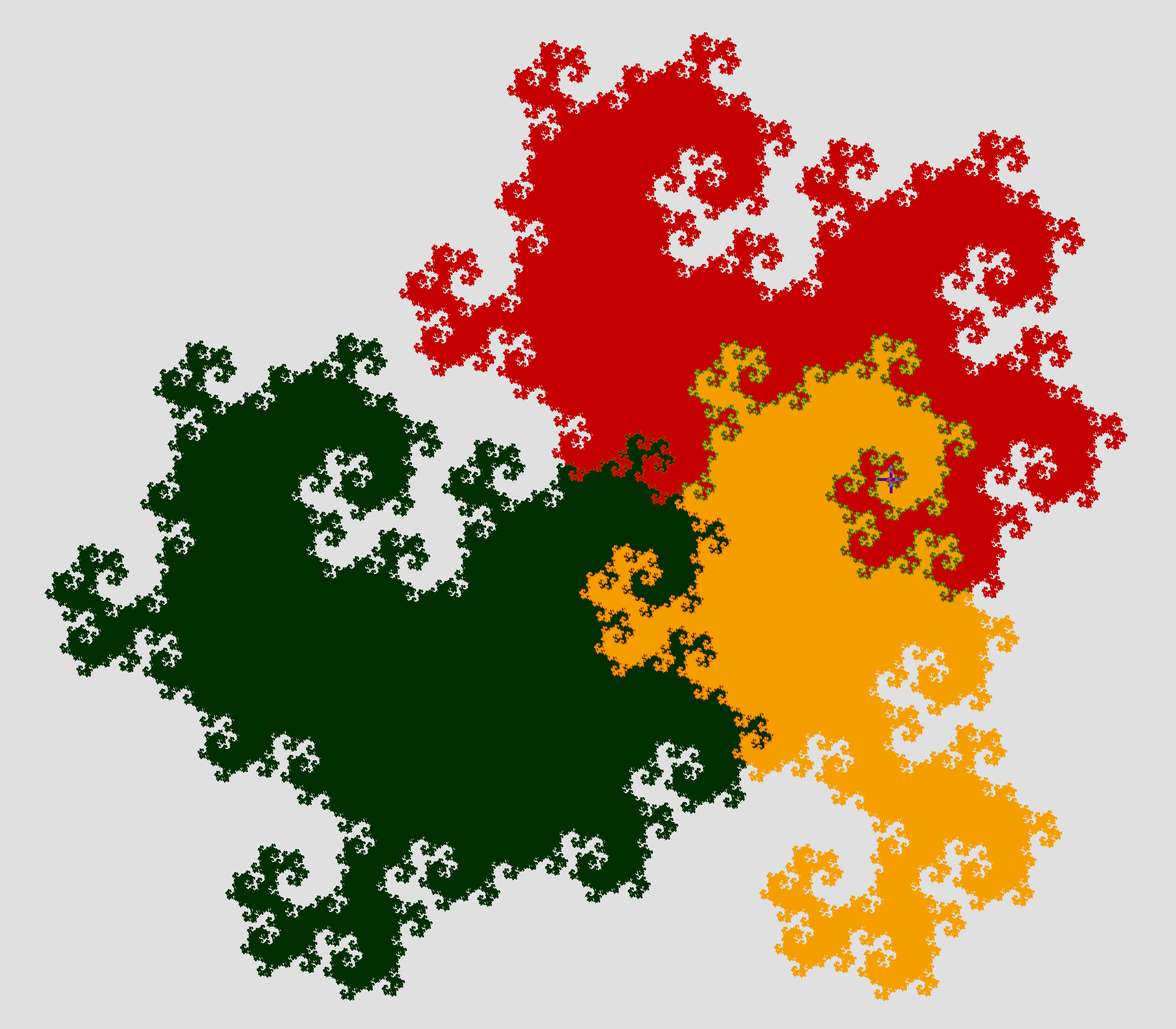
A Rauzy fractal associated with the plastic ratio-cubed. The central tile and its three subtiles have areas in the ratios ρ^{5} : ρ^{2} : ρ : 1.

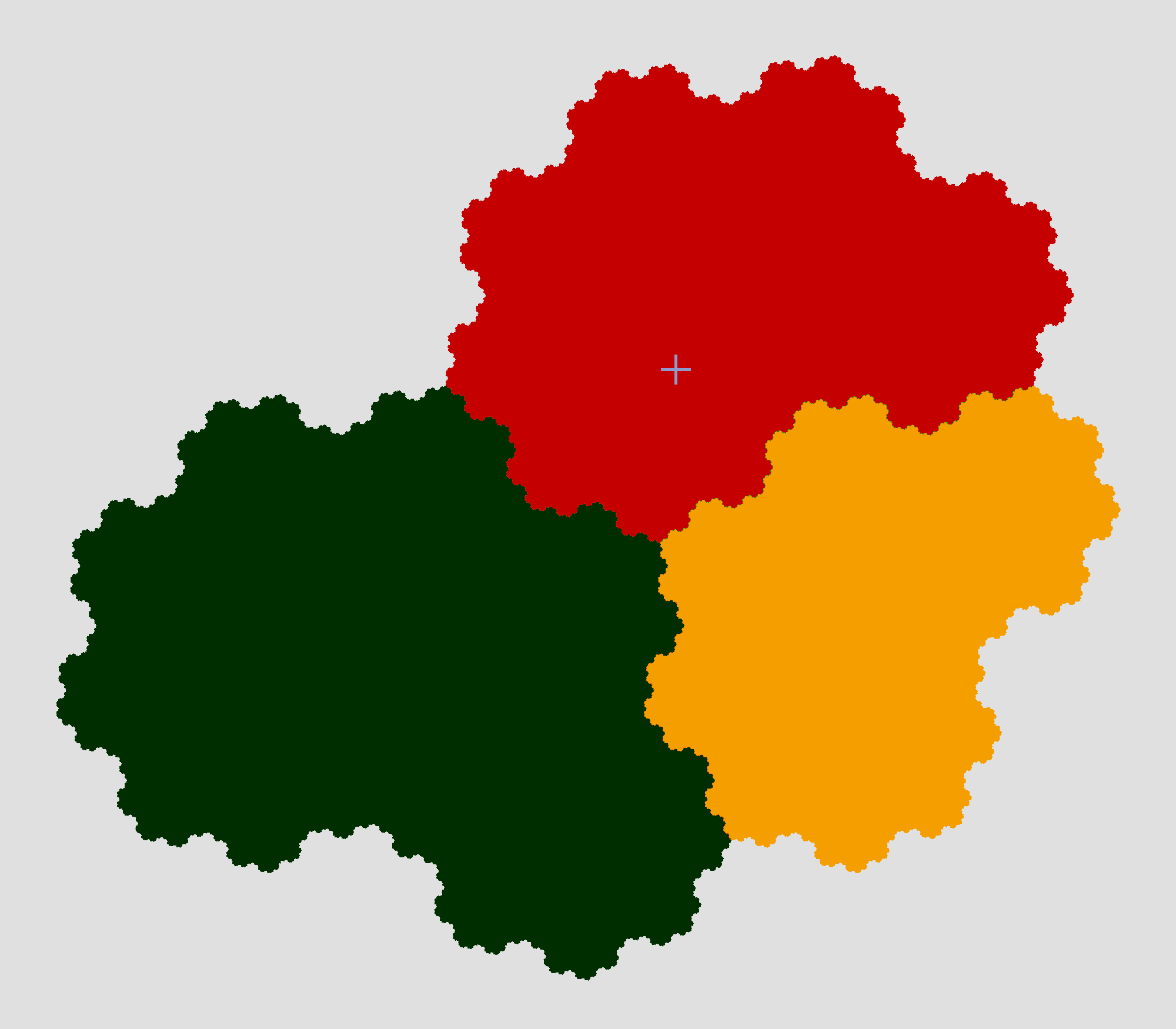
A Rauzy fractal associated with Ⴔ, the plastic ratio-squared; with areas as above.

Continued fraction pattern of a few low powers
$$\begin{align}
\rho^{-1} &= [0;1,3,12,1,1,3,2,3,2,...] \approx 0.7549 \;(\tfrac{25}{33}) \\
\rho^0 &= [1] \\
\rho^1 &= [1;3,12,1,1,3,2,3,2,4,...] \approx 1.3247 \;(\tfrac{45}{34}) \\
\rho^2 &= [1;1,3,12,1,1,3,2,3,2,...] \approx 1.7549 \;(\tfrac{58}{33}) \\
\rho^3 &= [2;3,12,1,1,3,2,3,2,4,...] \approx 2.3247 \;(\tfrac{79}{34}) \\
\rho^4 &= [3;12,1,1,3,2,3,2,4,2,...] \approx 3.0796 \;(\tfrac{40}{13}) \\
\rho^5 &= [4;12,1,1,3,2,3,2,4,2,...] \approx 4.0796 \;(\tfrac{53}{13})\,\ldots \\
\rho^7 &= [7;6,3,1,1,4,1,1,2,1,1,...] \approx 7.1592 \;(\tfrac{93}{13})\,\ldots \\
\rho^9 &= [12;1,1,3,2,3,2,4,2,141,...] \approx 12.5635 \;(\tfrac{88}{7})
\end{align}$$

The convergents of the continued fraction expansion of the plastic ratio are good rational approximations:
$$\tfrac{4}{3}, \tfrac{49}{37}, \tfrac{53}{40}, \tfrac{102}{77}, \tfrac{257}{194}, \tfrac{359}{271}, \tfrac{820}{619}, \tfrac{2819}{2128}, \tfrac{6458}{4875}, \tfrac{28651}{21628}, \tfrac{63760}{48131}, \ldots$$

The plastic ratio is the smallest Pisot number. By definition of these numbers, the absolute value $1 /\sqrt{\rho}$ of the algebraic conjugates is smaller than 1, thus powers of $\rho$ generate almost integers. For example: $\rho^{29} =3480.0002874...$ $\approx 3480 +1/3479$. After 29 rotation steps the phases of the inward spiraling conjugate pair – initially close to $\pm 45 \pi/58$ – nearly align with the imaginary axis.

The infinite radicals (Note: The right-to-left order of operations is emphasized by writing ^{p}(x) instead of the usual x^{p} .)
$$\begin{align}
\rho &=\sideset{^{\tfrac13}}{ } (1 +\sideset{^{\tfrac13}}{ } (1 +\sideset{^{\tfrac13}}{ } (1 +\cdots))), \\
1/\rho &=\sideset{^{-\tfrac12}}{} (1 +\sideset{^{-\tfrac12}}{} (1 +\sideset{^{-\tfrac12}}{} (1 +\cdots )))
\end{align}$$
are analogous to
$$\begin{align}
\xi &=\sideset{^{\tfrac14}}{ } (1 +\sideset{^{\tfrac14}}{ } (1 +\sideset{^{\tfrac14}}{ } (1 +\cdots))), \\
1/\xi &=\sideset{^{-\tfrac13}}{ } (1 +\sideset{^{-\tfrac13}}{ } (1 +\sideset{^{-\tfrac13}}{ } (1 +\cdots))),
\end{align}$$
with Perron number $\xi$ the positive real root of $x^4 =x +1.$ The other real root is the negative reciprocal of the second Pisot number $\chi$.

The three zeros of the cubic $z^3 +z^2 -\rho z -(\rho +1)$ lie on a circle with radius $\rho$. Similarly, the zeros of $z^3 +\tfrac{1}{\xi} z^2 -z -(\tfrac{1}{\xi} +1)$ lie on a circle with radius $\xi$. In both cases, the complex conjugate zeros have approximate argument $\pm \tfrac56 \pi$.

The minimal polynomial of the plastic ratio $m(x) =x^3 -x -1$ has discriminant $\Delta=-23 .$ The Hilbert class field of imaginary quadratic field $K = \mathbb{Q}( \sqrt{\Delta})$ can be formed by adjoining $\rho$. With argument $\tau=(1 +\sqrt{\Delta})/2$ a generator for the ring of integers of $K$, one has the special value of Dedekind eta quotient
$$\rho =\frac{ e^{\pi i/24}\,\eta(\tau)}{ \sqrt{2}\,\eta(2\tau)} .$$

Expressed in terms of the Weber-Ramanujan class invariant G_{n} (Note: German Wikipedia has a table of analytical values of the Ramanujan G-function for odd arguments below 47.)
$$\rho =\frac{ \mathfrak{f} ( \sqrt{ \Delta} ) }{ \sqrt{2} } = \frac{ G_{23} }{ \sqrt[4]{2} }.$$

Properties of the related Klein j-invariant $j(\tau)$ result in near identity $e^{\pi \sqrt{- \Delta}} \approx \left( \sqrt{2}\,\rho \right)^{24} - 24 .$ The difference is < 1/12659.

The elliptic integral singular value $k_{r} =\lambda^{*}(r)$ for $r=23$ has closed form expression
$$\lambda^{*}(23) =\sin ( \arcsin \left( ( \sqrt[4]{2}\,\rho)^{-12} \right) /2)$$
(which is less than 1/3 the eccentricity of the orbit of Venus).

== Van der Laan sequence ==
Table of the eight Van der Laan measures
k	n − m	$V_n /V_m$	err$(\rho^{k})$	interval
0	3 − 3	1 /1	0	minor element
1	8 − 7	4 /3	1/116	major element
2	10 − 8	7 /4	−1/205	minor piece
3	10 − 7	7 /3	1/116	major piece
4	7 − 3	3 /1	−1/12	minor part
5	8 − 3	4 /1	−1/12	major part
6	13 − 7	4^{2}/3	−1/14	minor whole
7	10 − 3	7 /1	−1/6	major whole

Namesake of the sequence is the Dutch architect and Benedictine monk Dom Hans van der Laan (1904-1991), who based his system of spatial proportions on the first eight powers of the plastic ratio. He found that the terms 1, 3, 4 and 7 sufficed for constructing a basic set of rational approximations (types of size), which he promoted as a fundamental principle in architectural design.

The Van der Laan and Padovan sequences differ only in their initial terms. The Van der Laan sequence is related to the Perrin numbers as the Fibonacci sequence is to the Lucas numbers. In combinatorics, the number of compositions of n into parts 2 and 3 is counted by the nth Van der Laan number.

The sequence is defined by the third-order recurrence relation
$$V_n =V_{n-2} +V_{n-3} \text{ for } n > 2,$$
with initial values
$$V_1 =0, V_0 =V_2 =1.$$

The first few terms are 1, 0, 1, 1, 1, 2, 2, 3, 4, 5, 7, 9, 12, 16, 21, 28, 37, 49, 65, 86,... (sequence A182097 in the OEIS). The limit ratio between consecutive terms is the plastic ratio:$\lim_{n\rightarrow\infty} V_{n+1}/V_n =\rho.$
An alternative relation for $n >4$ is $V_n =V_{n-1} +V_{n-5}.$

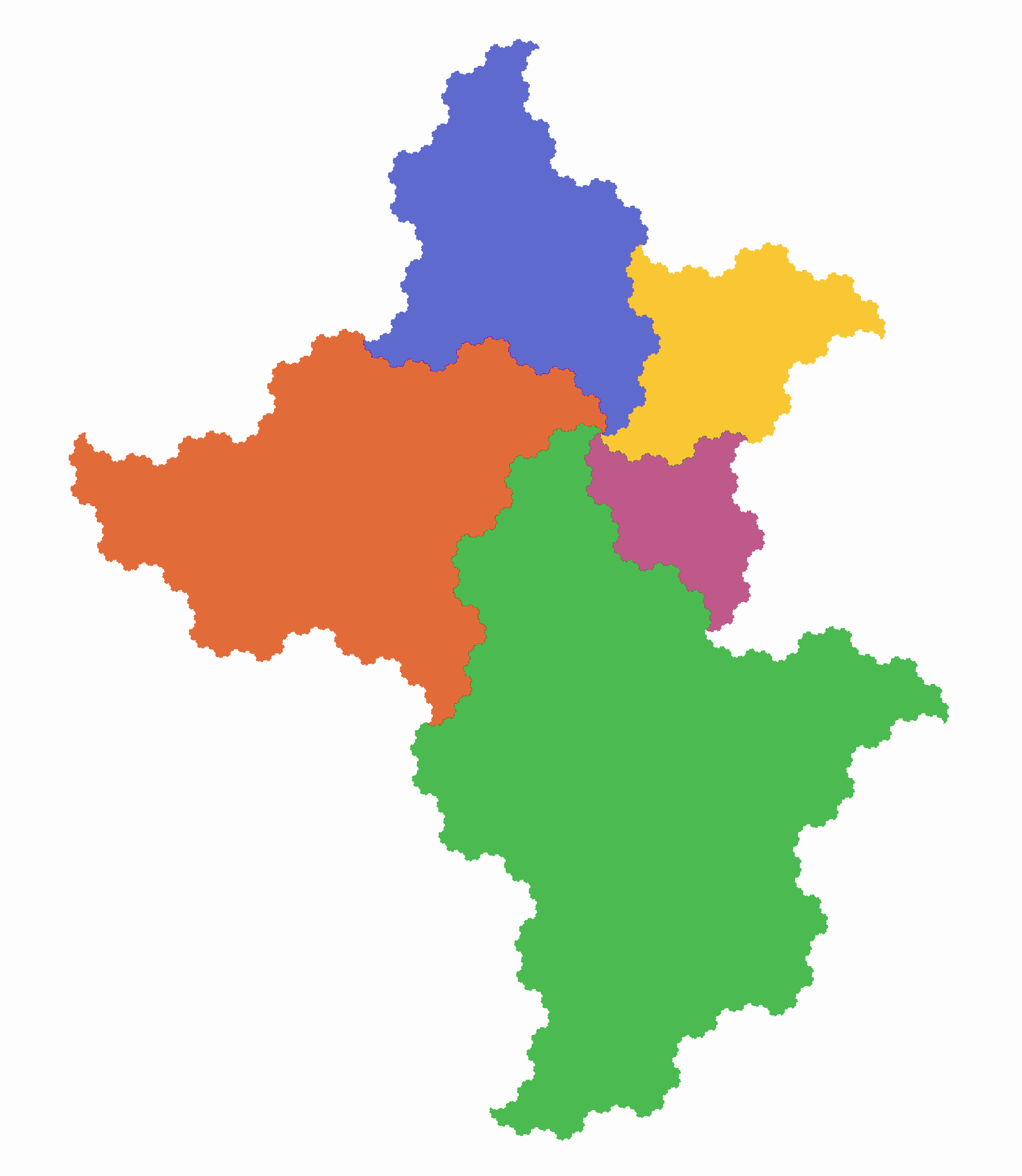
A fan of plastic Rauzy tiles with areas in ratio Ⴔ. The fractal boundary has box-counting dimension 1.11

The generating function of the Van der Laan sequence is
$$\frac{1}{1 -x^2 -x^3} =\sum_{n=0}^{\infty} V_n x^n \text{ for } x <\tfrac{1}{\rho}$$

Taking the sum of the first $n$ terms gives
$$V_{n+4} -1 =\sum_{k=0}^{n-1} {V_k}.$$

Expressing the terms as sums of binomial coefficients
$$V_n =\sum_{k =\lfloor (n +2)/3 \rfloor}^{\lfloor n /2 \rfloor}{k \choose n -2k}$$

The sequence is extended to negative indices using
$$V_n =V_{n+3} -V_{n+1},$$
obtaining (1), 0, 0, 1,−1, 1, 0,−1, 2,−2, 1, 1,−3, 4,−3, 0, 4,−7, 7,−3,... (sequence A176971 in the OEIS).

Powers of the plastic ratio can be written with Van der Laan numbers as quadratic coefficients
$$\rho^n =\rho^2 V_{n-2} +\rho V_{n-1} +V_{n-3},$$
which is proved by mathematical induction on $n.$ This relation also holds for $n < 0.$ The order of the coefficients corresponds to the bottom row of matrix $Q$ below.

The characteristic equation of the recurrence is $x^3 -x -1 =0.$ If the three solutions are real root $\rho$ and conjugate pair $\beta$ and $\gamma$, the Van der Laan numbers are given by the Binet formula
$$V_{n-1} =a \rho^n +b \beta^n +c \gamma^n ,$$
with real $a$ and conjugates $b$ and $c$ the roots of $23x^3 +x -1 =0.$

Since $\left\vert b \beta^n +c \gamma^n \right\vert < \rho^{-n/2}$, the number $V_n$ is the nearest integer to $a\,\rho^{n+1}$, with $n > 1$ and coefficient $a =\rho^2 /(\rho^3 +\rho +2) =$ 0.3106288296404670777619027...

Coefficients $a =b =c =1$ result in the Binet formula for the related sequence $P_n =2V_n +V_{n-3} .$
The first few terms are 3, 0, 2, 3, 2, 5, 5, 7, 10, 12, 17, 22, 29, 39, 51, 68, 90, 119,... (sequence A001608 in the OEIS).

This Perrin sequence has the Fermat property: if p is prime, $P_{p} \equiv P_1 \bmod p .$ The converse does not hold, but the small number of pseudoprimes $n \mid P_n$ makes the sequence special. The only 7 composite numbers below 10^{8} to pass the test are n = 521^{2}, 904631, 16532714, 24658561, 27422714, 27664033, 46672291.

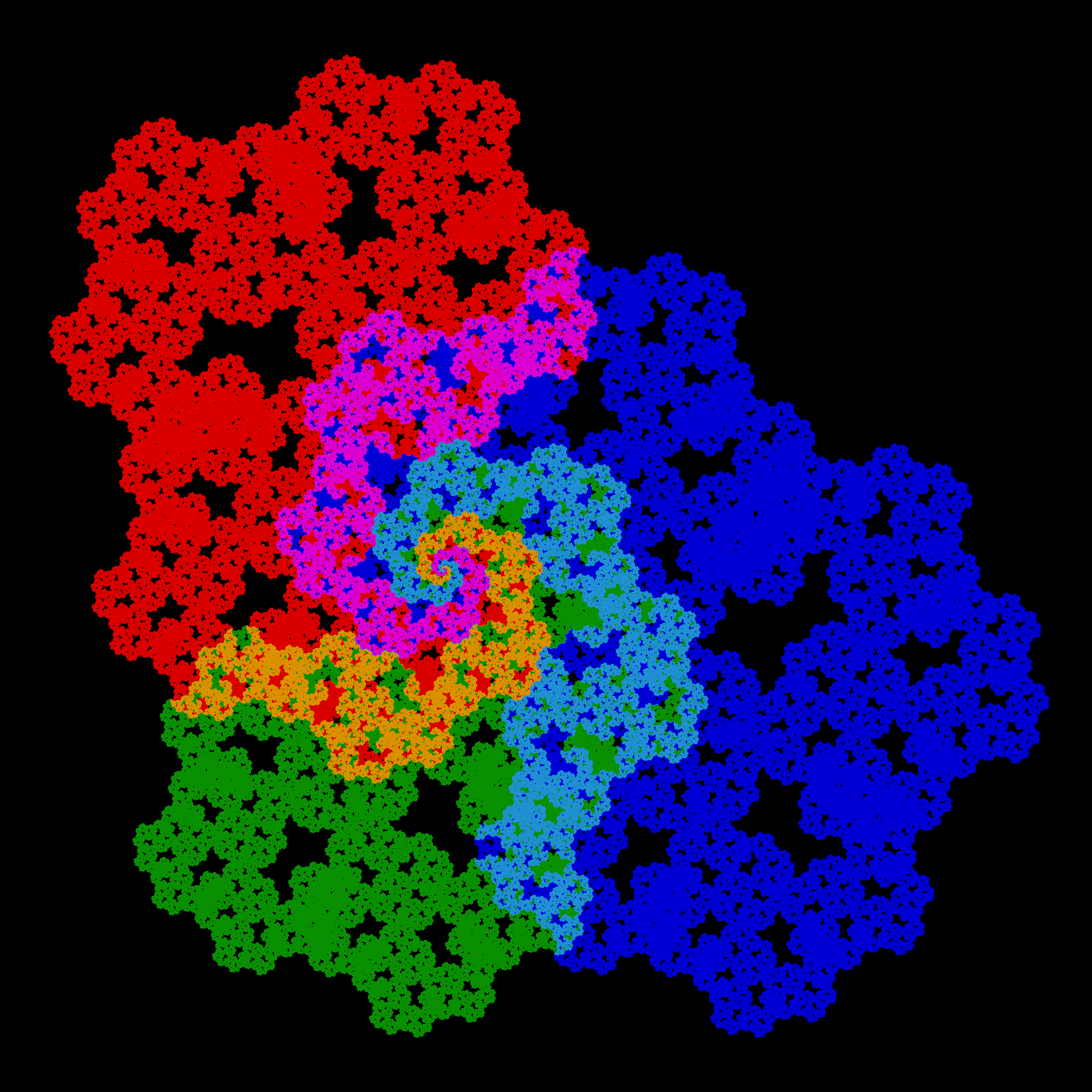
A plastic Rauzy fractal: the combined surface and the three separate tiles have areas in the ratios ρ^{5} : ρ^{2} : ρ : 1.

The Van der Laan numbers are obtained as integral powers n > 2 of a matrix with real eigenvalue $\rho$
$$Q = \begin{pmatrix} 0 & 1 & 1 \\ 1 & 0 & 0 \\ 0 & 1 & 0 \end{pmatrix} ,$$

$$Q^n = \begin{pmatrix} V_n & V_{n+1} & V_{n-1} \\ V_{n-1} & V_n & V_{n-2} \\ V_{n-2} & V_{n-1} & V_{n-3} \end{pmatrix}$$

The trace of $Q^n$ gives the Perrin numbers.

Alternatively, $Q$ can be interpreted as incidence matrix for a D0L Lindenmayer system on the alphabet $\{a,b,c\}$ with corresponding substitution rule
$$\begin{cases}
a \;\mapsto \;b \\
b \;\mapsto \;ac \\
c \;\mapsto \;a \end{cases}$$
and initiator $w_0=c$. The series of words $w_n$ produced by iterating the substitution have lengths $l(w_n) =V_{n+2}$. The number of c, b and a's in each word is equal to successive Van der Laan numbers. Associated to this string rewriting process is a set composed of three overlapping self-similar tiles called the Rauzy fractal, that visualizes the combinatorial information contained in a multiple-generation letter sequence.

The ratio between the number of digits in successive strings for the ternary version of the look-and-say sequence converges to $\rho$.

== Geometry ==
=== Partitioning the square ===
Three partitions of a square into similar rectangles, 1 = 3·1/3 = 2/3 + 2·1/6 = 1/ρ^{2} + 1/ρ^{4} + 1/ρ^{8} .

There are precisely three ways of partitioning a square into three similar rectangles:

1. The trivial solution given by three congruent rectangles with aspect ratio 3:1.
2. The solution in which two of the three rectangles are congruent and the third one has twice the side lengths of the other two, where the rectangles have aspect ratio 3:2.
3. The solution in which the three rectangles are all of different sizes and where they have aspect ratio ρ^{2}. The ratios of the linear sizes of the three rectangles are: ρ (large:medium); ρ^{2} (medium:small); and ρ^{3} (large:small). The internal, long edge of the largest rectangle (the square's fault line) divides two of the square's four edges into two segments each that stand to one another in the ratio ρ. The internal, coincident short edge of the medium rectangle and long edge of the small rectangle divides one of the square's other, two edges into two segments that stand to one another in the ratio ρ^{4}.

The fact that a rectangle of aspect ratio ρ^{2} can be used for dissections of a square into similar rectangles is equivalent to an algebraic property of the number ρ^{2} related to the Routh–Hurwitz theorem: all of its conjugates have positive real part.

=== Cubic Lagrange interpolation ===
The relation x_{c} + t = √ρ in a rho-squared rectangle.

The unique positive node $t$ that optimizes cubic Lagrange interpolation on the interval [−1,1] is equal to 0.41779130... The square of $t$ is the single real root of polynomial $P(x) =25x^3 +17x^2 +2x -1$ with discriminant $D =-23^3.$ Expressed in terms of the plastic ratio, $t =\sqrt{\rho} /(\rho^2 +1),$ which is verified by insertion into $P.$

With optimal node set $T =\{-1,-t, t, 1\},$ the Lebesgue function $\lambda_3(x)$ evaluates to the minimal cubic Lebesgue constant $\Lambda_3(T) = \frac{1 +t^2}{1 -t^2}$ at critical point $x_c =\rho^2 t.$ (Note: The square of x_{c} is the single real root of polynomial R(x) = 25x^{3} − 23x^{2} + 7x − 1 with discriminant D = −2^{6} 23. The equality x_{c} = ρ^{2}t is verified by insertion into R.)

The constants are related through $x_c +t =\sqrt{\rho}$ and can be expressed as infinite geometric series
$$\begin{align}
x_c &=\sum_{n=0}^{\infty} \sqrt{\rho^{-(8n +5)}} \\
t &=\sum_{n=0}^{\infty} \sqrt{\rho^{-(8n +9)}}.\end{align}$$
Each term of the series corresponds to the diagonal length of a rectangle with edges in ratio $\rho^2,$ which results from the relation $\rho^n =\rho^{n-1} +\rho^{n-5},$ with $n$ odd. The diagram shows the sequences of rectangles with common shrink rate $\rho^{-4}$ converge at a single point on the diagonal of a rho-squared rectangle with length $\sqrt{\rho \vphantom{/}} =\sqrt{1 +\rho^{-4}}.$

=== Plastic pentagon ===
A triskeles of plastic pentagons.

A spiral of equilateral triangles with edges in ratio $\rho$ tiles a plastic pentagon with four angles of 120 and one of 60 degrees. The initial triangle is positioned at the left-hand side of a parallelogram with base to side ratio $\rho$ and left base angle 60 degrees, so that two edges of the triangle are collinear with sides of the parallelogram. Scaling the parallelogram in ratio $\tfrac{1}{\rho},$ accompanied with a clockwise rotation by 60 degrees, the horizontal base is mapped onto the third edge of the triangle. The centre of rotation is on the short (falling) diagonal, dividing it in ratio $\rho^3$, the expansion rate for a half-turn. Iteration of the process traces an infinite, closed sequence of equilateral triangles with pentagonal boundary.

The logarithmic spiral through the vertices of all triangles has polar slope $k =\frac{3}{\pi} \ln( \rho).$ For parallelogram base $\rho$, the length of the short diagonal is $\sqrt{\rho^2 - \rho + 1}$ with angle $\arctan( \tfrac{\sqrt{3}}{1 -2\rho}).$ The length of the discrete spiral is $\rho^5 =\sum_{n=0}^{\infty} \rho^{-n};$ the pentagon has area $\tfrac{\sqrt{3}}{4} \rho^3 =\tfrac{\sqrt{3}}{4} \sum_{n=0}^{\infty} \rho^{-2n}.$

In the vector image, the construction is repeated on each side of a $\rho$ triangle. John Rutherford Boyd discovered a related figure, build on the sides of the $\rho^{-4}$ triangle.

=== Plastic spiral ===
Two plastic spirals with different initial radii.

Chambered nautilus shell and plastic spiral.

A plastic spiral is a logarithmic spiral that gets wider by a factor of $\rho$ for every quarter turn. It is described by the polar equation $r( \theta) =a \exp(k \theta),$ with initial radius $a$ and parameter $k =\frac{2}{\pi} \ln( \rho).$ If drawn on a rectangle with sides in ratio $\rho$, the spiral has its pole at the foot of altitude of a triangle on the diagonal and passes through vertices of rectangles with aspect ratio $\rho^2$ which are perpendicularly aligned and successively scaled by a factor $\rho^{-1}.$

In 1838 Henry Moseley noticed that whorls of a shell of the chambered nautilus are in geometrical progression: "It will be found that the distance of any two of its whorls measured upon a radius vector is one-third that of the next two whorls measured upon the same radius vector ... The curve is therefore a logarithmic spiral." Moseley thus gave the expansion rate $\sqrt[4]{3} \approx \rho -1/116$ for a quarter turn. (Note: For a typical 8" nautilus shell the difference in diameter between the apertures of perfect 3^{1/4} and ρ−sized specimens is about 1 mm. Allowing for phenotypic plasticity, they may well be indistinguishable.) Considering the plastic ratio a three-dimensional equivalent of the ubiquitous golden ratio, it appears to be a natural candidate for measuring the shell. (Note: An alternative is the omega constant 0.567143... which satisfies Ω⋅exp(Ω) = 1. Resembling φ (φ−1) = 1, Mathworld suggests it is like a "golden ratio for exponentials". The interval 3^{1/4} < ρ < Ω^{−1/2} is smaller than 0.012.)

=== Polyhedra ===
The plastic ratio is important in the study of the snub icosidodecadodecahedron.

== History and names ==
The 1924 Cordonnier cut. With S_{1} = 3, S_{2} = 4, S_{3} = 5, the harmonic mean of S_{2}/S_{1} , (S_{1} + S_{2})/S_{3} , S_{3}/S_{2} is 3 / (3/4 + 5/7 + 4/5 ) ≈ ρ + 1/4922.

ρ was first studied by Axel Thue in 1912 and by G. H. Hardy in 1919. French high school student Gérard Cordonnier discovered the ratio for himself in 1924. In his correspondence with Hans van der Laan a few years later, he called it the radiant number (French: le nombre radiant). Van der Laan initially referred to it as the fundamental ratio (Dutch: de grondverhouding), using the plastic number (Dutch: het plastische getal) from the 1950s onward. In 1944 Carl Siegel showed that ρ is the smallest possible Pisot–Vijayaraghavan number and suggested naming it in honour of Thue.

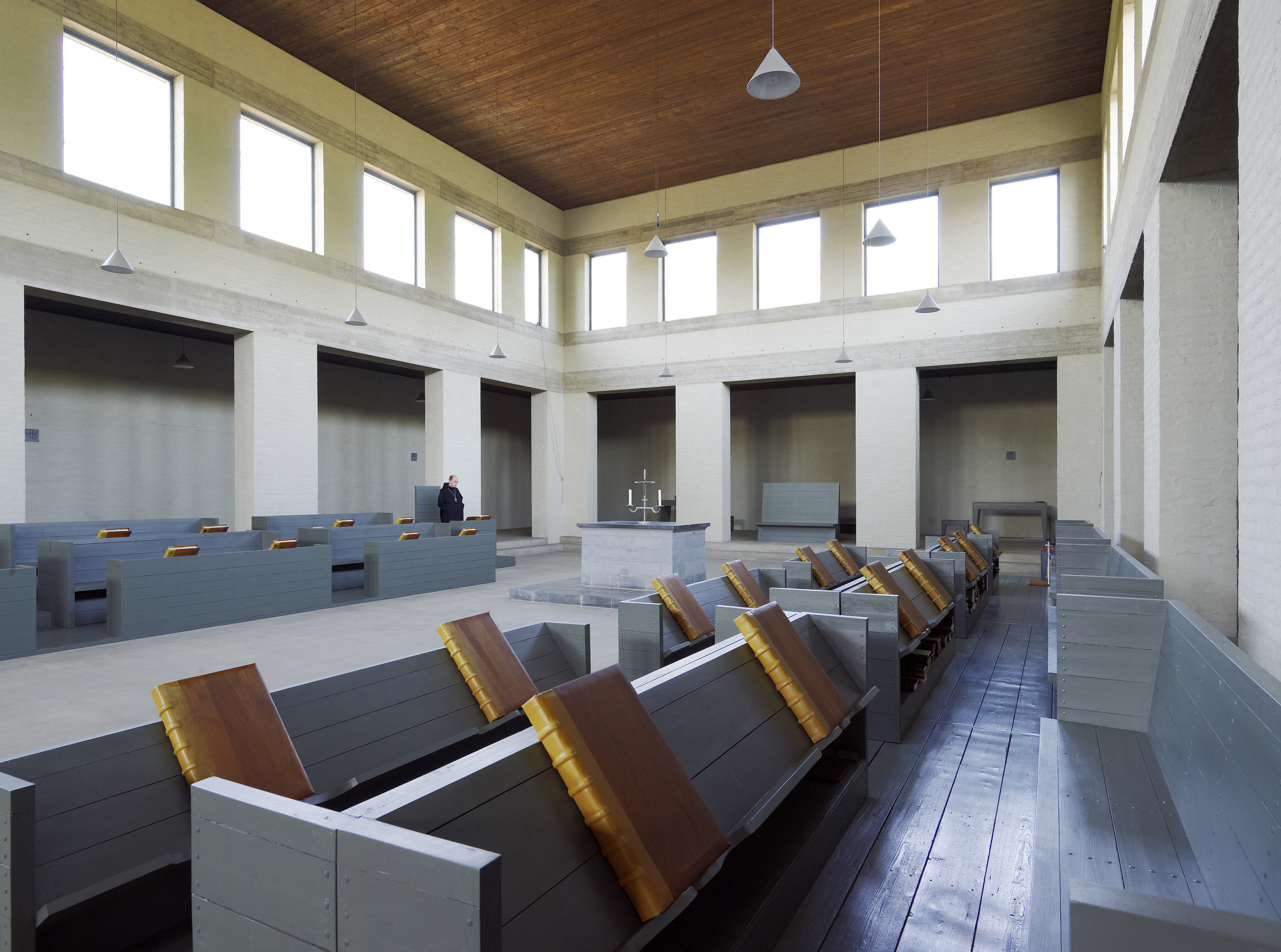
The 1967 St. Benedictusberg Abbey church designed by Hans van der Laan.

Unlike the names of the golden and silver ratios, the word plastic was not intended by Van der Laan to refer to a specific substance, but rather in its adjectival sense, meaning something that can be given a three-dimensional shape. Van der Laan studied limits of the human ability to both differentiate and relate spatial dimensions. Convinced that he had discovered a range of proportions that our perception regards as belonging to a unified order of size, he would promote its application in all his subsequent teachings and architectural designs.

The plastic number is also sometimes called the silver number, a name given to it by Midhat J. Gazalé and subsequently used by Martin Gardner, but that name is more commonly used for the silver ratio 1 + √2, one of the ratios from the family of metallic means first described by Vera W. de Spinadel. Gardner suggested referring to ρ^{2} as "high phi", and Donald Knuth created a special typographic mark for this name, a variant of the Greek letter phi ("φ") with its central circle raised, resembling the Georgian letter pari ("Ⴔ").

== See also ==
Solutions of equations similar to $x^3 =x +1$:

- Golden ratio – the positive solution of the equation $x^2 =x +1$
- Supergolden ratio – the real solution of the equation $x^3 =x^2 +1$
- Tribonacci ratio – the real solution of the equation $x^3 =x^2 +x +1$
