= Raphaël Salem =

Greek mathematician (1898–1963)

- Raphaël Salem
- Born: 7 November 1898; Salonika, Ottoman Empire (now Thessaloniki, Greece)
- Died: 20 June 1963 (aged 64); Paris, France
- Education: University of Paris; École Centrale Paris
- Known for: Salem number; Salem–Spencer set
- Scientific career
- Fields: Mathematician
- Workplaces: MIT, École Centrale Paris, University of Caen
- Doctoral students: Stephen H. Crandall

Raphaël Salem (Greek: Ραφαέλ Σαλέμ; 7 November 1898 – 20 June 1963) was a Greek mathematician after whom the Salem numbers and Salem–Spencer sets are named, and whose widow founded the Salem Prize.

== Biography ==
Raphaël Salem was born in Saloniki, Ottoman Empire (now Thessaloniki, Greece) to Emmanuel and Fortunée Salem. His father was a well-known lawyer who dealt with international problems. Raphaël was brought up in a Jewish family who followed the traditions of their ancestors. At age 15, the family moved to France and Salem attended the Lycée Condorcet for two years. Believing that he would follow in his father's footsteps, Salem entered the Law Faculty of the University of Paris. His interests, though, were not in law but rather in mathematics and engineering. Soon thereafter, Salem started taking mathematics courses with Hadamard all the while continuing his studies for law. In 1919, he received his law degree. He then began working for a doctorate in law, but quickly decided to change direction to science, which he had been studying for years in parallel to his work in law.

After receiving his licence ès sciences from the Sorbonne, Salem then worked for a degree in engineering. In 1921, he received the degree of Ingénieur des Arts et Manufactures from the École Centrale des Arts et Manufactures. Having completed his studies in law, science and engineering, Salem then went into banking and started working for Banque de Paris et des Pays-Bas in 1921. In his free time, he worked on Fourier series, a topic which interested him throughout his life.

In the spring of 1939, Salem collaborated with the young Polish mathematician Józef Marcinkiewicz, and he continued to write mathematics papers while working for the bank. With a deteriorating political situation in France and the beginning of World War II in September 1939, Salem was called up for military duty. He was attached to the Deuxième Bureau of the General Staff of the French Army. He was sent to England to assist the Head of the Franco-British Coordination Committee and then demobilised in June 1940. Salem left England in the autumn of 1940 and emigrated to the United States where he settled in Cambridge, Massachusetts. In 1941, he was appointed as a lecturer in mathematics at MIT, where he was rapidly promoted and became an assistant and associate professor. In 1958, he was appointed as Professor at the Sorbonne and lived in Paris until his death in 1963. In 1967, Éditions Hermann published Salem's Oeuvres mathématiques, edited by his collaborators Antoni Zygmund and Jean-Pierre Kahane. After Salem's death, his widow established the Salem Prize, an international prize given to young researchers for outstanding contributions to Fourier series.

== Personal life ==
In 1923 Salem married a young woman named Adriana and the couple had three children: a daughter and two sons. His father died in Paris in 1940 while his mother, his sister, his sister's husband, and his sister's son, were all arrested and deported to a Nazi concentration camp where they all died. Salem's older son survived the war and he enlisted in the free French Forces and took part in Allied landings in the South of France in 1944. By this time his surviving family had managed to escape from France and they relocated to Canada.

Along with his interest in mathematics, Salem also loved music and playing the violin, preferring to play in quartets. He was also interested in the arts and literature; he enjoyed sports, especially skiing and horseback riding.

== Books ==
- Essais sur les séries trigonométriques, Paris, Hermann 1940
- Algebraic Numbers and Fourier Analysis, Boston, Heath, 1963
- Œuvres mathématiques de Raphaël Salem, Paris, Hermann, 1967
- with Jean-Pierre Kahane: Ensembles parfaits et séries trigonométriques, Paris, Hermann, 1963, 1994
