= Conjugate element (field theory) =

Roots of an algebraic element's minimal polynomial

In mathematics, in particular field theory, the conjugate elements or algebraic conjugates of an algebraic element α, over a field extension L/K, are the roots of the minimal polynomial p_{K,α}(x) of α over K. Conjugate elements are commonly called conjugates in contexts where this is not ambiguous. Normally α itself is included in the set of conjugates of α.

Equivalently (if L/K is normal), the conjugates of α are the images of α under the field automorphisms of L that leave fixed the elements of K. The equivalence of the two definitions is one of the starting points of Galois theory.

The concept generalizes complex conjugation, since the algebraic conjugates over $\R$ of a complex number are the number itself and its complex conjugate.

== Example ==
The cube roots of unity are:

$$\sqrt[3]{1} = \begin{cases}1 \\[3pt] -\frac{1}{2}+\frac{\sqrt{3}}{2}i \\[5pt] -\frac{1}{2}-\frac{\sqrt{3}}{2}i \end{cases}$$

The latter two roots are conjugate elements in Q[i√3] with minimal polynomial

$$\left(x+\frac{1}{2}\right)^2+\frac{3}{4}=x^2+x+1.$$

== Properties ==
If K is given inside an algebraically closed field C, then the conjugates can be taken inside C. If no such C is specified, one can take the conjugates in some relatively small field L. The smallest possible choice for L is to take a splitting field over K of p_{K,α}, containing α. If L is any normal extension of K containing α, then by definition it already contains such a splitting field.

Given then a normal extension L of K, with automorphism group Aut(L/K) = G, and containing α, any element g(α) for g in G will be a conjugate of α, since the automorphism g sends roots of p to roots of p. Conversely any conjugate β of α is of this form: in other words, G acts transitively on the conjugates. This follows as K(α) is K-isomorphic to K(β) by irreducibility of the minimal polynomial, and any isomorphism of fields F and F' that maps polynomial p to p' can be extended to an isomorphism of the splitting fields of p over F and p' over F', respectively.

In summary, the conjugate elements of α are found, in any normal extension L of K that contains K(α), as the set of elements g(α) for g in Aut(L/K). The number of repeats in that list of each element is the separable degree [L:K(α)]_{sep}.

A theorem of Kronecker states that if α is a nonzero algebraic integer such that α and all of its conjugates in the complex numbers have absolute value at most 1, then α is a root of unity. There are quantitative forms of this, stating more precisely bounds (depending on degree) on the largest absolute value of a conjugate that imply that an algebraic integer is a root of unity.
