= List of mathematical constants =

A mathematical constant is a key number whose value is fixed by an unambiguous definition, often referred to by a symbol (e.g., an alphabet letter), or by mathematicians' names to facilitate using it across multiple mathematical problems. For example, the constant π may be defined as the ratio of the length of a circle's circumference to its diameter. The following list includes a decimal expansion and set containing each number, ordered by year of discovery.

The column headings may be clicked to sort the table alphabetically, by decimal value, or by set. Explanations of the symbols in the right hand column can be found by clicking on them.

== List ==
Name	Symbol	Decimal expansion	Formula	Year	Set			
Name	Symbol	Decimal expansion	Formula	Year	$\mathbb{Q}$	$\mathbb{A}$	$\mathcal{P}$	$\mathcal{E}\mathcal{P}$
Zero	0	0	Additive identity of $\mathbb{C}$	300 to 100 BCE	✓	✓	✓	✓
One	1	1	Multiplicative identity of $\mathbb{C}$	Prehistory	✓	✓	✓	✓
Two	2	2		Prehistory	✓	✓	✓	✓
One half	1/2	0.5	Multiplicative inverse of 2	Prehistory	✓	✓	✓	✓
Pi	$\pi$	3.14159 26535 89793 23846 (Note: OEIS: A000796)	Ratio of a circle's circumference to its diameter	1900 to 1600 BCE	✗	✗	✓	✓
Tau	$\tau$	6.28318 53071 79586 47692 (Note: OEIS: A019692)	Ratio of a circle's circumference to its radius; equal to $2\pi$	1900 to 1600 BCE	✗	✗	✓	✓
Square root of 2, Pythagoras constant	$\sqrt{2}$	1.41421 35623 73095 04880 (Note: OEIS: A002193)	Positive root of $x^2=2$	1800 to 1600 BCE	✗	✓	✓	✓
Square root of 3, Theodorus' constant	$\sqrt{3}$	1.73205 08075 68877 29352 (Note: OEIS: A002194)	Positive root of $x^2=3$	465 to 398 BCE	✗	✓	✓	✓
Square root of 5	$\sqrt{5}$	2.23606 79774 99789 69640 (Note: OEIS: A002163)	Positive root of $x^2=5$		✗	✓	✓	✓
Phi, Golden ratio	$\varphi$ or $\phi$	1.61803 39887 49894 84820 (Note: OEIS: A001622)	$\frac{1+\sqrt{5}}{2}$	~300 BCE	✗	✓	✓	✓
Silver ratio	$\sigma$	2.41421 35623 73095 04880 (Note: OEIS: A014176)	$\sqrt{2}+1$	~300 BCE	✗	✓	✓	✓
Negative one	−1	−1	Additive inverse of 1	300 to 200 BCE	✓	✓	✓	✓
Cube root of 2, Delian constant	$\sqrt[3]{2}$	1.25992 10498 94873 16476 (Note: OEIS: A002580)	Real root of $x^3=2$	46 to 120 CE	✗	✓	✓	✓
Cube root of 3	$\sqrt[3]{3}$	1.44224 95703 07408 38232 (Note: OEIS: A002581)	Real root of $x^3=3$		✗	✓	✓	✓
Twelfth root of 2	$\sqrt[12]{2}$	1.05946 30943 59295 26456 (Note: OEIS: A010774)	Real positive root of $x^{12}=2$		✗	✓	✓	✓
Supergolden ratio	$\psi$	1.46557 12318 76768 02665 (Note: OEIS: A092526)	$\frac{1 + \sqrt[3]{\frac{29 + 3\sqrt{93}}{2}} + \sqrt[3]{\frac{29 - 3\sqrt{93}}{2}}}{3}$ Real root of $x^{3} = x^{2} + 1$		✗	✓	✓	✓
Imaginary unit	$i$	0 + 1i	Principal root of $x^2=-1$ (Note: Both i and −i are roots of this equation, though neither root is truly "positive" nor more fundamental than the other as they are algebraically equivalent. The distinction between signs of i and −i is in some ways arbitrary, but a useful notational device. See imaginary unit for more information.)	1501 to 1576	✗	✓	✓	✓
Connective constant for the hexagonal lattice	$\mu$	1.84775 90650 22573 51225 (Note: OEIS: A179260)	$\sqrt{2 + \sqrt{2}}$, as a root of the polynomial $x ^ 4-4 x ^ 2 + 2=0$	1593	✗	✓	✓	✓
Kepler–Bouwkamp constant	$K'$	0.11494 20448 53296 20070 (Note: OEIS: A085365)	$\prod_{n=3}^\infty \cos\left(\frac{\pi}{n} \right) = \cos\left(\frac{\pi}{3} \right) \cos\left(\frac{\pi}{4} \right) \cos\left(\frac{\pi}{5}\right) ...$	1596	?	?	?	?
Wallis's constant		2.09455 14815 42326 59148 (Note: OEIS: A007493)	$\sqrt[3]{\frac{45-\sqrt{1929}}{18}}+\sqrt[3]{\frac{45+\sqrt{1929}}{18}}$ Real root of $x^{3} - 2x - 5 = 0$	1616 to 1703	✗	✓	✓	✓
Euler's number	$e$	2.71828 18284 59045 23536 (Note: OEIS: A001113)	$\lim_{n \to \infty} \left( 1 + \frac {1}{n}\right)^n = \sum_{n=0}^{\infty}\frac{1}{n!} = 1 + \frac{1}{1!} + \frac{1}{2!} + \frac{1}{3!} \cdots$	1618	✗	✗	?	✓
Natural logarithm of 2	$\ln 2$	0.69314 71805 59945 30941 (Note: OEIS: A002162)	Real root of $e^{x} = 2$ $\sum_{n=1}^\infty \frac{(-1)^{n+1}}{n} = \frac{1}{1} - \frac{1}{2} + \frac{1}{3} - \frac{1}{4} + \cdots$	1619 & 1668	✗	✗	✓	✓
Sophomore's dream second constant	$I_2$	1.29128 59970 62663 54040 (Note: OEIS: A073009)	$\int_0^1 x^{-x} dx = \sum_{n=1}^\infty n^{-n}$	1697	?	?	?	?
Lemniscate constant	$\varpi$	2.62205 75542 92119 81046 (Note: OEIS: A062539)	$2\int_{0}^1\frac{dt}{\sqrt{1-t^4}} = \frac14 \sqrt{\frac{2}{\pi}}\,\Gamma {\left(\frac14 \right)^2}$ Ratio of the perimeter of Bernoulli's lemniscate to its diameter	1718 to 1798	✗	✗	✓	✓
Basel's number	$\zeta(2)$	1.64493 40668 48226 43647 (Note: OEIS: A013661)	$\sum_{n=1}^\infty\frac{1}{n^2} = \frac{1}{1^2}+\frac{1}{2^2} + \frac{1}{3^2} + \frac{1}{4^2} + \frac{1}{5^2} + \cdots = \frac{\pi^2}{6}$	1734	✗	✗	✓	✓
Euler's constant	$\gamma$	0.57721 56649 01532 86060 (Note: OEIS: A001620)	$\lim_{n\to\infty}\left(-\log n + \sum_{k=1}^n \frac1{k}\right)=\int_1^\infty\left(-\frac1x+\frac1{\lfloor x\rfloor}\right)\,dx$ Limiting difference between the harmonic series and the natural logarithm	1735	?	?	?	✓
Erdős–Borwein constant	$E$	1.60669 51524 15291 76378 (Note: OEIS: A065442)	$\sum_{n=1}^{\infty}\frac{1}{2^n-1} = \frac{1}{1} \! + \! \frac{1}{3} \! + \! \frac{1}{7} \! + \! \frac{1}{15} \! + \! \cdots$	1749	✗	?	?	?
Square super-root of 2	$\sqrt{2}_s$	1.55961 04694 62369 34997 (Note: OEIS: A030798)	Real root of $x^x=2$	1758 & 1783	✗	✗	?	?
Omega constant	$\Omega$	0.56714 32904 09783 87299 (Note: OEIS: A030178)	$W_0(1)=\frac{1}{\pi}\int_0^\pi\log\left(1+\frac{\sin t}{t}e^{t\cot t}\right)dt$ with the Lambert W function $W_0$	1758 & 1783	✗	✗	?	?
Apéry's constant	$\zeta(3)$	1.20205 69031 59594 28539 (Note: OEIS: A002117)	$\zeta(3)=\sum_{n=1}^\infty\frac{1}{n^3} = \frac{1}{1^3}+\frac{1}{2^3} + \frac{1}{3^3} + \frac{1}{4^3} + \frac{1}{5^3} + \cdots$ with the Riemann zeta function $\zeta(s)$	1780	✗	?	✓	✓
Laplace limit		0.66274 34193 49181 58097 (Note: OEIS: A033259)	Real root of $\frac{ x e^\sqrt{x^2+1}}{\sqrt{x^2+1}+1} = 1$	~1782	✗	✗	?	?
Soldner constant	$\mu$	1.45136 92348 83381 05028 (Note: OEIS: A070769)	$\mathrm{li}(x) = \int_0^x \frac{dt}{\ln t} = 0$; Root of the logarithmic integral function	1792	?	?	?	?
Gauss's constant	$G$	0.83462 68416 74073 18628 (Note: OEIS: A014549)	$\frac{1}{\mathrm{agm}(1, \sqrt{2})} = \frac{1}{4\pi} \sqrt{\frac{2}{\pi}}\Gamma\left(\frac{1}{4}\right)^2=\frac \varpi\pi$ where agm is the arithmetic–geometric mean and $\varpi$ is the lemniscate constant	1799	✗	✗	?	✓
Second Hermite constant	$\gamma_{2}$	1.15470 05383 79251 52901 (Note: OEIS: A246724)	$\frac{2}{\sqrt{3}}$	1822 to 1901	✗	✓	✓	✓
Liouville's constant	$L$	0.11000 10000 00000 00000 0001 (Note: OEIS: A012245)	$\sum_{n=1}^\infty \frac{1}{10^{n!}} = \frac {1}{10^{1!}} + \frac{1}{10^{2!}} + \frac{1}{10^{3!}} + \frac{1}{10^{4!}} + \cdots$	Before 1844	✗	✗	?	?
First continued fraction constant	$C_1$	0.69777 46579 64007 98201 (Note: OEIS: A052119)	$C_1=[0;1,2,3,4,5,...]=\frac{I_1(2)}{I_0(2)}$ where I_{α}(x) are the modified Bessel functions of the first kind	1855	✗	✗	?	?
Ramanujan's constant		262 53741 26407 68743.99999 99999 99250 073 (Note: OEIS: A060295)	$e^{\pi\sqrt{163}}$	1859	✗	✗	?	?
Glaisher–Kinkelin constant	$A$	1.28242 71291 00622 63687 (Note: OEIS: A074962)	$e^{\frac{1}{12}-\zeta^\prime(-1)} = e^{\frac{1}{8}-\frac{1}{2}\sum\limits_{n=0}^\infty \frac{1}{n+1} \sum\limits_{k=0}^n \left(-1\right)^k \binom{n}{k} \left(k+1\right)^2 \ln(k+1)}$	1860	?	?	?	?
Catalan's constant	$G$	0.91596 55941 77219 01505 (Note: OEIS: A006752)	$\beta(2)=\sum_{n=0}^\infty\frac{(-1)^n}{(2n+1)^2} = \frac{1}{1^2}-\frac{1}{3^2} + \frac{1}{5^2} - \frac{1}{7^2} + \frac{1}{9^2} + \cdots$ with the Dirichlet beta function $\beta(s)$	1864	?	?	✓	✓
Dottie number	$D$	0.73908 51332 15160 64165 (Note: OEIS: A003957)	Real root of $\cos x = x$	1865	✗	✗	?	?
Meissel–Mertens constant	$M$	0.26149 72128 47642 78375 (Note: OEIS: A077761)	$\lim_{n\to\infty}\left(\sum_{p\le n}\frac{1}{p}-\ln\ln n\right) = \gamma + \sum_{p}\left(\ln\left(1 - \frac{1}{p}\right) + \frac{1}{p}\right)$ where γ is the Euler–Mascheroni constant and p is prime	1866 & 1873	?	?	?	?
Universal parabolic constant	$P$	2.29558 71493 92638 07403 (Note: OEIS: A103710)	$\ln(1 + \sqrt2) + \sqrt2 \; = \; \operatorname{arsinh}(1)+\sqrt{2}$	Before 1891	✗	✗	✓	✓
Cahen's constant	$C$	0.64341 05462 88338 02618 (Note: OEIS: A118227)	$\sum_{k=1}^{\infty} \frac{(-1)^{k}}{s_k-1} = \frac{1}{1} - \frac{1}{2} + \frac{1}{6} - \frac{1}{42} + \frac{1}{1806} {\,\pm \cdots}$ where s_{k} is the kth term of Sylvester's sequence (2, 3, 7, 43, 1807, ...)	1891	✗	✗	?	?
Gelfond's constant	$e^{\pi}$	23.14069 26327 79269 0057 (Note: OEIS: A039661)	$(-1)^{-i} = i^{-2i} = \sum_{n=0}^\infty \frac{\pi^{n}}{n!} = 1 + \frac{\pi^{1}}{1} + \frac{\pi^{2}}{2} + \frac{\pi^{3}}{6} + \cdots$	1900	✗	✗	?	?
Totient summatory constant		1.33978 41535 74347 24659 (Note: OEIS: A065483)	$\prod_{p\in\mathbb{P}} \left(1+\frac 1 {p^2(p-1)} \right)$ where $\mathbb{P}$ is the set of prime numbers	1900	?	?	?	?
Gelfond–Schneider constant	$2^{\sqrt{2}}$	2.66514 41426 90225 18865 (Note: OEIS: A007507)	$2^{\sqrt{2}}$	Before 1902	✗	✗	?	?
Second Favard constant	$K_{2}$	1.23370 05501 36169 82735 (Note: OEIS: A111003)	$\frac{\pi^2}{8} = \sum_{n = 0}^\infty \frac{1}{(2n+1)^2} = \frac{1}{1^2}+\frac{1}{3^2}+\frac{1}{5^2}+\frac{1}{7^2}+\cdots$	1902 to 1965	✗	✗	✓	✓
Golden angle	$g$	2.39996 32297 28653 32223 (Note: OEIS: A131988)	$\frac{2\pi}{\varphi^2} = \pi (3-\sqrt{5})$ or $180 (3-\sqrt{5})=137.50776\ldots$ in degrees	1907	✗	✗	✓	✓
Sierpiński's constant	$K$	2.58498 17595 79253 21706 (Note: OEIS: A062089)	$$\begin{align} &\pi\left(2\gamma+\ln\frac{4\pi^3}{\Gamma(\tfrac{1}{4})^4}\right) = \pi (2 \gamma + 4 \ln\Gamma(\tfrac{3}{4}) - \ln\pi) \\ &= \pi \left(2 \ln 2+3 \ln \pi + 2 \gamma - 4 \ln \Gamma (\tfrac{1}{4})\right) \end{align}$$	1907	?	?	?	?
Landau–Ramanujan constant	$K$	0.76422 36535 89220 66299 (Note: OEIS: A064533)	$\frac1{\sqrt2}\prod_{{p \equiv 3 \text{ mod } 4}\atop p \;{\rm prime}} {\left(1-\frac1{p^2}\right)^{-\frac{1}{2}}}\!\!=\frac\pi4\prod_{{p \equiv 1 \text{ mod } 4}\atop p \;{\rm prime}} {\left(1-\frac1{p^2}\right)^\frac{1}{2}}$	1908	?	?	?	?
First Nielsen–Ramanujan constant	$a_{1}$	0.82246 70334 24113 21823 (Note: OEIS: A072691)	$\frac{{\zeta}(2)}{2} = \frac{\pi^2}{12} = \sum_{n=1}^\infty\frac{(-1)^{n+1}}{n^2} = \frac{1}{1^2} {-} \frac{1}{2^2} {+} \frac{1}{3^2} {-} \frac{1}{4^2} {+} \cdots$	1909	✗	✗	✓	✓
Gieseking constant	$V$	1.01494 16064 09653 62502 (Note: OEIS: A143298)	$\frac{3\sqrt{3}}{4} \left(1- \sum_{n=0}^\infty \frac{1}{(3n+2)^2}+ \sum_{n=1}^\infty\frac{1}{(3n+1)^2} \right)$ $=\frac{\sqrt 3}{3}\left(\frac{\psi_1(1/3)}{2}-\frac{\pi^2}{3}\right)$ with the trigamma function $\psi_1$	1912	?	?	✓	✓
Bernstein's constant	$\beta$	0.28016 94990 23869 13303 (Note: OEIS: A073001)	$\lim_{n\to\infty} 2n E_{2n}(f)$, where E_{n}(f) is the error of the best uniform approximation to a real function f(x) on the interval [−1, 1] by real polynomials of no more than degree n, and f(x) = |x|	1913	?	?	?	?
Tribonacci constant	$\rho$	1.83928 67552 14161 13255 (Note: OEIS: A058265)	$\frac{1+\sqrt[3]{19+3\sqrt{33}}+\sqrt[3]{19-3\sqrt{33}}}{3} = \frac{1+4\cosh\left(\frac{1}{3}\cosh^{-1}\left(2+\frac{3}{8}\right)\right)}{3}$ Real root of $x^{3} - x^{2} - x - 1 = 0$	1914 to 1963	✗	✓	✓	✓
Kempner series's value		22.92067 66192 64150 34816 (Note: OEIS: A082838)	$\sum_{n\in N*} \frac{1}{n}$ where $N*$ denotes the set of all positive integers whose decimal expression contains no nines	1914	?	?	?	?
Kempner number	$\kappa$	0.81642 15090 21893 14370 (Note: OEIS: A007404)	$2^{-2^0} + 2^{-2^1} + 2^{-2^2} + 2^{-2^3} + \cdots = \sum_{n\ge 0} 2^{-2^n}$	1916	✗	✗	?	?
Brun's constant	$B_{2}$	≈ 1.90216 05831 04 (Note: OEIS: A065421)	$\textstyle {\sum\limits_p(\frac1{p}+\frac1{p+2})} = (\frac1{3} \! + \! \frac1{5}) + (\tfrac1{5} \! + \! \tfrac1{7}) + (\tfrac1{11} \! + \! \tfrac1{13}) + \cdots$ where the sum ranges over all primes p such that p + 2 is also a prime	1919	?	?	?	?
Twin primes constant	$C_{2}$	0.66016 18158 46869 57392 (Note: OEIS: A005597)	$\prod_{\textstyle{p\;{\rm prime}\atop p \ge 3}} \left(1 - \frac{1}{(p-1)^2}\right)$	1922	?	?	?	?
Plastic ratio	$\rho$	1.32471 79572 44746 02596 (Note: OEIS: A060006)	$\sqrt[3]{1 + \! \sqrt[3]{1 + \! \sqrt[3]{1 + \cdots}}} = \textstyle \sqrt[3]{\frac{1}{2}+\frac{\sqrt{69}}{18}}+\sqrt[3]{\frac{1}{2}-\frac{\sqrt{69}}{18}}$ Real root of $x^{3} = x + 1$	1924	✗	✓	✓	✓
Bloch's constant	$B$	$0.4332\leq B\leq 0.4719$ (Note: OEIS: A085508)	The best known bounds are $\frac{\sqrt{3}}{4}+2\times10^{-4}\leq B\leq \sqrt{\frac{\sqrt{3}-1}{2}}\cdot\frac{\Gamma(\frac{1}{3})\Gamma(\frac{11}{12})}{\Gamma(\frac{1}{4})}$	1925	?	?	?	?
Z score for the 97.5 percentile point	$z_{.975}$	1.95996 39845 40054 23552 (Note: OEIS: A220510)	$\sqrt{2}\operatorname{erf}^{-1}(0.95)$ where erf^{−1}(x) is the inverse error function Real number $z$ such that $\frac{1}{\sqrt{2\pi}}\int_{-\infty}^{z} e^{-x^2/2} \, \mathrm{d}x = 0.975$	1925	?	?	?	?
Landau's constant	$L$	$0.5 < L \le 0.54326$ (Note: OEIS: A081760)	The best known bounds are $0.5 < L \le \frac{\Gamma(\frac{1}{3})\Gamma(\frac{5}{6})}{\Gamma(\frac{1}{6})}$.	1929	?	?	?	?
Landau's third constant	$A$	$0.5 < A \le 0.7853$		1929	?	?	?	?
Prouhet–Thue–Morse constant	$\tau$	0.41245 40336 40107 59778 (Note: OEIS: A014571)	$\sum_{n=0}^{\infty} \frac{t_n}{2^{n+1}} = \frac{1}{4}\left[2-\prod_{n=0}^{\infty}\left(1-\frac{1}{2^{2^n}}\right)\right]$ where ${t_n}$ is the n^{th} term of the Thue–Morse sequence	1929	✗	✗	?	?
Golomb–Dickman constant	$\lambda$	0.62432 99885 43550 87099 (Note: OEIS: A084945)	$\int_{0}^{1} e^{\mathrm{li}(t)} dt = \int_0^{\infty} \frac{\rho(t)}{t+2} dt$ where li(t) is the logarithmic integral, and ρ(t) is the Dickman function	1930 & 1964	?	?	?	?
Constant related to the asymptotic behavior of Lebesgue constants	$c$	0.98943 12738 31146 95174 (Note: OEIS: A243277)	$\lim_{n\to\infty}\!\! \left(\!{L_n{-}\frac{4}{\pi^2}\ln(2n{+}1)}\!\!\right)\!{=} \frac{4}{\pi^2}\!\left({-}\frac{\Gamma'(\tfrac12)}{\Gamma(\tfrac12)}{+}{\sum_{k=1}^\infty \!\frac{2\ln k}{4k^2{-}1}} \right)$	1930	?	?	?	?
Feller–Tornier constant	$\mathcal{C}_{\mathrm{FT}}$	0.66131 70494 69622 33528 (Note: OEIS: A065493)	${\frac{1}{2}\prod_{p\text{ prime}} \left(1-\frac{2}{p^2}\right) + \frac{1}{2}} =\frac{3}{\pi^2}\prod_{p\text{ prime}} \left(1-\frac{1}{p^2-1}\right) + \frac{1}{2}$	1932	?	?	?	?
Base 10 Champernowne constant	$C_{10}$	0.12345 67891 01112 13141 (Note: OEIS: A033307)	Defined by concatenating representations of successive integers: 0.1 2 3 4 5 6 7 8 9 10 11 12 13 14 ...	1933	✗	✗	?	?
Salem constant	$\sigma_{10}$	1.17628 08182 59917 50654 (Note: OEIS: A073011)	Largest real root of $x^{10}+x^9-x^7-x^6-x^5-x^4-x^3+x+1=0$	1933	✗	✓	✓	✓
Khinchin's constant	$K_{0}$	2.68545 20010 65306 44530 (Note: OEIS: A002210)	$\prod_{n=1}^\infty \left[{1+{1\over n(n+2)}}\right]^{\log_2(n)}$	1934	?	?	?	?
Lévy's constant (1)	$\beta$	1.18656 91104 15625 45282 (Note: OEIS: A100199)	$\frac {\pi^2}{12\,\ln 2}$	1935	?	?	?	?
Lévy's constant (2)	$e^{\beta}$	3.27582 29187 21811 15978 (Note: OEIS: A086702)	$e^{\pi^2/(12\ln2)}$	1936	?	?	?	?
Linnik's constant	$L$	$L$ ≤ 3.99	Exponent constant appearing in the Linnik's theorem about prime numbers in arithmetic progression	1944	?	?	?	?
Copeland–Erdős constant	$\mathcal{C}_{CE}$	0.23571 11317 19232 93137 (Note: OEIS: A033308)	Defined by concatenating representations of successive prime numbers: 0.2 3 5 7 11 13 17 19 23 29 31 37 ...	1946	✗	?	?	?
Mills' constant	$A$	1.30637 78838 63080 69046 (Note: Its precise value is not known, but it is about 1.306 under the assumption that the Riemann hypothesis holds.) (Note: OEIS: A051021)	Smallest positive real number A such that $\lfloor A^{3^{n}} \rfloor$ is prime for all positive integers n	1947	✗	?	?	?
Gompertz constant	$\delta$	0.59634 73623 23194 07434 (Note: OEIS: A073003)	$\int_0^\infty \!\! \frac{e^{-x}}{1+x} \, dx = \!\! \int_0^1 \!\! \frac{dx}{1-\ln x} = {\tfrac 1 {1+\tfrac 1{1+\tfrac 1{1+\tfrac 2{1+\tfrac 2{1+\tfrac 3{1+3{/\cdots}} }}}}}}$	Before 1948	?	?	?	✓
Third continued fraction constant	$C_3$	1.52513 52761 60981 20908 (Note: OEIS: A111129)	${1+\tfrac 1 {1+\tfrac 2{1+\tfrac 3{1+\tfrac 4{1+\tfrac 5{1+ 6{/\cdots} }}}}}} = \sqrt\frac{2}{e \pi}\left[1 - \operatorname{erf}\left(\sqrt\frac{1}{2}\right)\right]^{-1}$ where $\operatorname{erf}(x)$ is the error function	1948	?	?	?	?
de Bruijn–Newman constant	$\Lambda$	$0\le\Lambda\le0.2$	The number $\Lambda$ such that $H(\lambda,z)=\int^{\infty}_0e^{\lambda u^2}\Phi(u)\cos(zu)du$ has real zeros if and only if λ ≥ Λ where $\Phi(u)=\sum_{n=1}^{\infty}(2\pi^2n^4e^{9u}-3\pi n^2e^{5u})e^{-\pi n^2e^{4u}}$	1950	?	?	?	?
Van der Pauw constant	$\frac{\pi}{\ln 2}$	4.53236 01418 27193 80962 (Note: OEIS: A163973)	$\frac{\pi}{\ln 2}$	Before 1958 (Note: OEIS: A163973)	✗	?	?	?
Magic angle	$\theta_{\mathrm{m}}$	0.95531 66181 245092 78163 (Note: OEIS: A195696)	$\arctan \sqrt{2} = \arccos \tfrac{1}{\sqrt 3} \approx \textstyle {54.7356} ^{ \circ }$	Before 1959	✗	✗	✓	✓
Artin's constant	$C_{\mathrm{Artin}}$	0.37395 58136 19202 28805 (Note: OEIS: A005596)	$\prod_{p\text{ prime}} \left(1-\frac{1}{p(p-1)}\right)$	Before 1961	?	?	?	?
Porter's constant	$C$	1.46707 80794 33975 47289 (Note: OEIS: A086237)	$\frac{6\ln 2}{\pi ^2} \left(3 \ln 2 + 4 \,\gamma -\frac{24}{\pi ^2} \,\zeta '(2)-2 \right)-\frac{1}{2}$ where γ is the Euler–Mascheroni constant and ζ '(2) is the derivative of the Riemann zeta function evaluated at s = 2	1961	?	?	?	?
Lochs constant	$L$	0.97027 01143 92033 92574 (Note: OEIS: A086819)	$\frac {6 \ln 2 \ln 10}{ \pi^2}$	1964	?	?	?	?
Infinite tetration of imaginary unit		0.438283 + 0.360592i (Note: OEIS: A077589) (Note: OEIS: A077590)	$\frac{2i}{\pi}W(\frac{-i \pi}{2})$ where $W$ is the Lambert W function	1966	✗	?	?	?
DeVicci's tesseract constant		1.00743 47568 84279 37609 (Note: OEIS: A243309)	Positive root of $4x^8{-}28x^6{-}7x^4{+}16x^2{+}16=0$ The edge length of the largest cube that can pass through a 4D hypercube	1966	✗	✓	✓	✓
Lieb's square ice constant		1.53960 07178 39002 03869 (Note: OEIS: A118273)	$\left(\frac{4}{3}\right)^\frac{3}{2}=\frac{8}{3\sqrt3}$	1967	✗	✓	✓	✓
Growth rate constant of fixed polyomino (Klarner's constant)	$\lambda_2$	4.00253 < $\lambda_2$ < 4.5252	$\lim_{n \rightarrow \infty} (M_n)^\frac{1}{n}$ where $M_n$ is the number of fixed polyominoes of size n	1967	?	?	?	?
Growth rate constant of fixed polycube	$\lambda_3$	6.3795 < $\lambda_3$ < 9.3835	$\lim_{n \rightarrow \infty} (M_n)^\frac{1}{n}$ where $M_n$ is the number of fixed polycubes of size n	1967	?	?	?	?
Niven's constant	$C$	1.70521 11401 05367 76428 (Note: OEIS: A033150)	$1+\sum_{n = 2}^\infty \left(1-\frac{1}{\zeta(n)} \right)$	1969	?	?	?	?
Stephens' constant	$C_S$	0.57595 99688 92945 43964 (Note: OEIS: A065478)	$\prod_{p\text{ prime}} \left(1 - \frac{p}{p^3-1}\right)$	1969	?	?	?	?
Regular paperfolding sequence	$P$	0.85073 61882 01867 26036 (Note: OEIS: A143347)	$\sum_{n=0}^{\infty} \frac {8^{2^n}}{2^{2^{n+2}}-1} = \sum_{n=0}^{\infty} \cfrac {\tfrac {1}{2^{2^n}}} {1-\tfrac{1}{2^{2^{n+2}}}}$	1970	✗	✗	?	?
Reciprocal Fibonacci constant	$\psi$	3.35988 56662 43177 55317 (Note: OEIS: A079586)	$\sum_{n=1}^{\infty} \frac{1}{F_n} = \frac{1}{1} + \frac{1}{1} + \frac{1}{2} + \frac{1}{3} + \frac{1}{5} + \frac{1}{8} + \frac{1}{13} + \cdots$ where F_{n} is the n^{th} Fibonacci number	1974	✗	?	?	?
Chvátal–Sankoff constant for the binary alphabet	$\gamma_2$	$0.788071 \le \gamma_2 \le 0.826280$	$\lim_{n\to\infty}\frac{\operatorname{E}[\lambda_{n,2}]}{n}$ where E[λ_{n,2}] is the expected longest common subsequence of two random length-n binary strings	1975	?	?	?	?
Feigenbaum constant δ	$\delta$	4.66920 16091 02990 67185 (Note: OEIS: A006890)	$\lim_{n \to \infty}\frac {a_{n+1}-a_n}{a_{n+2}-a_{n+1}}$ where the sequence a_{n} is given by n-th period-doubling bifurcation of logistic map $x_{k+1} = a x_k(1-x_k)$ or any other one-dimensional map with a single quadratic maximum	1975	?	?	?	?
Chaitin's constants	$\Omega$	In general they are uncomputables; one such number is 0.00787 49969 97812 3844. (Note: OEIS: A100264)	$\sum_{p \in P} 2^{-|p|}$ where p is a halted program, |p| is its size in bits, and P is the domain of all programs that stop	1975	✗	✗	✗	✗
Freiman's constant	$F$	4.52782 95661 60879 14088 (Note: OEIS: A118472)	End constant of the last gap in the Lagrange spectrum, a proper subset of the Markov spectrum	1975	✗	✓	✓	✓
Robbins constant	$\Delta(3)$	0.66170 71822 67176 23515 (Note: OEIS: A073012)	$\frac{4 \! + \! 17\sqrt2 \! -6 \sqrt3 \! -7\pi}{105} \! + \! \frac{\ln(1 \! + \! \sqrt2)}{5} \! + \! \frac{2\ln(2 \! + \! \sqrt3)}{5}$	1977	✗	✗	✓	✓
Weierstrass constant		0.47494 93799 87920 65033 (Note: OEIS: A094692)	$\frac{2^{5/4} \sqrt{\pi} \, e^{\pi/8}}{\Gamma(\frac{1}{4})^{2}}$ $\frac{\operatorname{\sigma}{(1;1,i)}}{2}$, where σ(z;ω_{1},ω_{2}) is the Weierstrass sigma function with half-periods ω_{1} and ω_{2}	Before 1978	✗	✗	?	?
Fransén–Robinson constant	$F$	2.80777 02420 28519 36522 (Note: OEIS: A058655)	$\int_{0}^\infty \frac{dx}{\Gamma(x)} = e + \int_0^\infty \frac{e^{-x}}{\pi^2 + \ln^2 x}\, dx$	1978	?	?	?	?
Feigenbaum constant α	$\alpha$	2.50290 78750 95892 82228 (Note: OEIS: A006891)	Ratio between the width of a tine and the width of one of its two subtines in a bifurcation diagram	1979	?	?	?	?
Beam detection constant	$L$	3.1415926535 ≤ $L$ ≤ 4.7998	Length of the shortest opaque set for the unit circle	Before 1980	?	?	?	?
Irrational number from Moser–de Bruijn sequence	$\alpha$	3.30033 00000 00000 33003 (Note: OEIS: A269707)	$3*\sum_{n\in E} 10^{-n}$ where $E$ denotes the Moser–de Bruijn sequence	1982	✗	✗	?	?
Second du Bois-Reymond constant	$C_2$	0.19452 80494 65325 11361 (Note: OEIS: A062546)	$\frac{e^2-7}{2} = \int_0^\infty \left|{\frac{d}{dt}\left(\frac{\sin t}{t}\right)^2}\right|\,dt-1$	1983	✗	✗	?	✓
Erdős–Tenenbaum–Ford constant	$\delta$	0.08607 13320 55934 20688 (Note: OEIS: A074738)	$1-\frac{1+\ln\ln2}{\ln2}$	1984	?	?	?	?
Conway's constant	$\lambda$	1.30357 72690 34296 39125 (Note: OEIS: A014715)	Real root of the polynomial $\begin{smallmatrix} x^{71}-x^{69}-2x^{68}-x^{67}+2x^{66}+2x^{65}+x^{64}-x^{63}-x^{62}-x^{61}-x^{60}\\ -x^{59}+2x^{58}+5x^{57}+3x^{56}-2x^{55}-10x^{54}-3x^{53}-2x^{52}+6x^{51}+6x^{50}\\ +x^{49}+9x^{48}-3x^{47}-7x^{46}-8x^{45}-8x^{44}+10x^{43}+6x^{42}+8x^{41}-5x^{40}\\ -12x^{39}+7x^{38}-7x^{37}+7x^{36}+x^{35}-3x^{34}+10x^{33}+x^{32}-6x^{31}-2x^{30}\\ -10x^{29}-3x^{28}+2x^{27}+9x^{26}-3x^{25}+14x^{24}-8x^{23}-7x^{21}+9x^{20}\\ +3x^{19}\!-4x^{18}\!-10x^{17}\!-7x^{16}\!+12x^{15}\!+7x^{14}\!+2x^{13}\!-12x^{12}\!-4x^{11}\!-2x^{10}\\ +5x^{9}+x^{7}-7x^{6}+7x^{5}-4x^{4}+12x^{3}-6x^{2}+3x-6\ =\ 0 \quad\quad\quad \end{smallmatrix}$ Limiting growth rate of the Look-and-say sequence starting at 1	1987	✗	✓	✓	✓
Hard hexagon entropy constant	$\kappa(1)$	1.39548 59724 79302 73522 (Note: OEIS: A085851)	Positive real root of the 24th degree polynomial (Note: $25937424601x^{24}+ 2013290651222784x^{22}+ 2505062311720673792x^{20}+ 797726698866658379776x^{18}+ 7449488310131083100160x^{16}+ 2958015038376958230528x^{14}-72405670285649161617408x^{12}+ 107155448150443388043264x^{10}-71220809441400405884928x^{8}-73347491183630103871488x^{6}+97143135277377575190528x^{4}-32751691810479015985152 = 0$)	1988	✗	✓	✓	✓
Hafner–Sarnak–McCurley constant	$\sigma$	0.35323 63718 54995 98454 (Note: OEIS: A085849)	$\prod_{p\text{ prime}}{\left(1- \left(1-\prod_{n\ge1}\left(1-\frac{1}{p^n}\right)\right)^2 \right)} \!$	1991	?	?	?	?
Backhouse's constant	$B$	1.45607 49485 82689 67139 (Note: OEIS: A072508)	$\lim_{k \to \infty}\left | \frac{q_{k+1}}{q_k} \right \vert \quad \scriptstyle \text {where:} \displaystyle \;\; Q(x)=\frac{1}{P(x)}= \! \sum_{k=1}^\infty q_k x^k$ $P(x) = 1+\sum_{k=1}^\infty {p_k x^k} = 1+2x+3x^2+5x^3+\cdots$ where p_{k} is the k^{th} prime number	1995	?	?	?	?
Viswanath constant	$V$	1.13198 82487 943 (Note: OEIS: A078416)	$\lim_{n \to \infty}|f_n|^\frac{1}{n}$ where f_{n} = f_{n−1} ± f_{n−2}, where the signs + or − are chosen at random with equal probability 1/2	1997	?	?	?	?
Komornik–Loreti constant	$q$	1.78723 16501 82965 93301 (Note: OEIS: A055060)	Real number $q$ such that $1 = \sum_{k=1}^\infty \frac{t_k}{q^k}$, or $\prod_{n=0}^\infty\left (1-\frac{1}{q^{2^n}}\right )+\frac{q-2}{q-1}=0$ where t_{k} is the k^{th} term of the Thue–Morse sequence	1998	✗	✗	?	?
Natural density constant of abundant numbers	$d_A$	0.2476171 < $d_A$ < 0.2476475	$\lim_{n \rightarrow \infty} \frac{\beta (n)}{n}$ where $\beta (n)$ is the number of abundant numbers less than or equal to n	Before 1998	?	?	?	?
Embree–Trefethen constant	$\beta^{\star}$	0.70258	The smallest value β such that solutions to the random sequence$f_n=\pm f_{n-1}\pm \beta f_{n-2}$ do not decay	1999	?	?	?	?
Heath-Brown–Moroz constant	$C$	0.00131 76411 54853 17810 (Note: OEIS: A118228)	$\prod_{p\text{ prime}} \left(1-\frac{1}{p}\right)^7\left(1+\frac{7p+1}{p^2}\right)$	1999	?	?	?	?
MRB constant	$S$	0.18785 96424 62067 12024 (Note: MRB constant) (Note: OEIS: A037077)	$\sum_{n=1}^{\infty} (-1)^n (n^{1/n}-1) = - \sqrt[1]{1} + \sqrt[2]{2} - \sqrt[3]{3} + \cdots$	1999	?	?	?	?
Prime constant	$\rho$	0.41468 25098 51111 66024 (Note: OEIS: A051006)	$\sum_{p\text{ prime}} \frac{1}{2^p}= \frac{1}{4} + \frac{1}{8} + \frac{1}{32} + \cdots$	1999	✗	?	?	?
Somos' quadratic recurrence constant	$\sigma$	1.66168 79496 33594 12129 (Note: OEIS: A112302)	$\prod_{n=1}^\infty n^{{1/2}^n} = \sqrt {1 \sqrt {2 \sqrt{3 \cdots}}} = 1^{1/2} \; 2^{1/4} \; 3^{1/8} \cdots$	1999	?	?	?	?
Foias constant	$\alpha$	1.18745 23511 26501 05459 (Note: OEIS: A085848)	The unique real number α such that if x_{1} = α then the sequence $x_{n+1} = \left( 1 + \frac{1}{x_n} \right)^n\text{ for }n=1,2,3,\ldots$ diverges to infinity	2000	?	?	?	?
Logarithmic capacity of the unit disk		0.59017 02995 08048 11302 (Note: OEIS: A249205)	$\frac{\Gamma(\tfrac14)^2}{4 \pi^{3/2}}=\frac{\varpi}{\pi\sqrt{2}}$ where $\varpi$ is the lemniscate constant	Before 2003	✗	✗	?	✓
Taniguchi constant	$C_T$	0.67823 44919 17391 97803 (Note: OEIS: A175639)	$\prod_{p\text{ prime}} \left(1 - \frac{3}{p^3}+\frac{2}{p^4}+\frac{1}{p^5}-\frac{1}{p^6}\right)$	Before 2005	?	?	?	?

== Mathematical constants sorted by their representations as continued fractions ==
The following list includes the continued fractions of some constants and is sorted by their representations. Continued fractions with more than 20 known terms have been truncated, with an ellipsis to show that they continue. Rational numbers have two continued fractions; the version in this list is the shorter one. Decimal representations are rounded or padded to 10 places if the values are known.

Name	Symbol	Set	Decimal expansion	Continued fraction	Notes
Zero	0	$\mathbb{Z}$	0.00000 00000	[0; ]	
Golomb–Dickman constant	$\lambda$		0.62432 99885	[0; 1, 1, 1, 1, 1, 22, 1, 2, 3, 1, 1, 11, 1, 1, 2, 22, 2, 6, 1, 1, …] (Note: OEIS: A225336)	Eric Weisstein noted that the continued fraction has an unusually large number of 1s.
Cahen's constant	$C_2$	$\mathbb{R} \setminus \mathbb{A}$	0.64341 05463	[0; 1, 1, 1, 2^{2}, 3^{2}, 13^{2}, 129^{2}, 25298^{2}, 420984147^{2}, 269425140741515486^{2}, …] (Note: OEIS: A006280)	All terms are squares and truncated at 10 terms due to large size. Davison and Shallit used the continued fraction expansion to prove that the constant is transcendental.
Euler–Mascheroni constant	$\gamma$		0.57721 56649	[0; 1, 1, 2, 1, 2, 1, 4, 3, 13, 5, 1, 1, 8, 1, 2, 4, 1, 1, 40, 1, …] (Note: OEIS: A002852)	Using the continued fraction expansion, it was shown that if γ is rational, its denominator must exceed 10^{244663}.
First continued fraction constant	$C_1$	$\mathbb{R} \setminus \mathbb{A}$	0.69777 46579	[0; 1, 2, 3, 4, 5, 6, 7, 8, 9, 10, 11, 12, 13, 14, 15, 16, …]	Equal to the ratio $I_{1}(2)/I_{0}(2)$ of modified Bessel functions of the first kind evaluated at 2.
Catalan's constant	$G$		0.91596 55942	[0; 1, 10, 1, 8, 1, 88, 4, 1, 1, 7, 22, 1, 2, 3, 26, 1, 11, 1, 10, 1, …] (Note: OEIS: A014538)	Computed up to 4851389025 terms by E. Weisstein.
One half	1/2	$\mathbb{Q}$	0.50000 00000	[0; 2]	
Prouhet–Thue–Morse constant	$\tau$	$\mathbb{R} \setminus \mathbb{A}$	0.41245 40336	[0; 2, 2, 2, 1, 4, 3, 5, 2, 1, 4, 2, 1, 5, 44, 1, 4, 1, 2, 4, 1, …] (Note: OEIS: A014572)	Infinitely many partial quotients are 4 or 5, and infinitely many partial quotients are greater than or equal to 50.
Copeland–Erdős constant	$\mathcal{C}_{CE}$	$\mathbb{R} \setminus \mathbb{Q}$	0.23571 11317	[0; 4, 4, 8, 16, 18, 5, 1, 1, 1, 1, 7, 1, 1, 6, 2, 9, 58, 1, 3, 4, …] (Note: OEIS: A030168)	Computed up to 1011597392 terms by E. Weisstein. He also noted that while the Champernowne constant continued fraction contains sporadic large terms, the continued fraction of the Copeland–Erdős Constant do not exhibit this property.
Base 10 Champernowne constant	$C_{10}$	$\mathbb{R} \setminus \mathbb{A}$	0.12345 67891	[0; 8, 9, 1, 149083, 1, 1, 1, 4, 1, 1, 1, 3, 4, 1, 1, 1, 15, 4.57540×10^{165}, 6, 1, …] (Note: OEIS: A030167)	Champernowne constants in any base exhibit sporadic large numbers; the 40th term in $C_{10}$ has 2504 digits.
One	1	$\mathbb{N}$	1.00000 00000	[1; ]	
Phi, Golden ratio	$\varphi$	$\mathbb{A}$	1.61803 39887	[1; 1, 1, 1, 1, 1, 1, 1, 1, 1, 1, 1, 1, 1, 1, 1, 1, 1, 1, 1, 1, …]	The convergents are ratios of successive Fibonacci numbers.
Brun's constant	$B_2$		1.90216 05831	[1; 1, 9, 4, 1, 1, 8, 3, 4, 7, 1, 3, 3, 1, 2, 1, 1, 12, 4, 2, 1, …]	The n^{th} roots of the denominators of the n^{th} convergents are close to Khinchin's constant, suggesting that $B_2$ is irrational. If true, this would prove the twin prime conjecture.
Square root of 2	$\sqrt 2$	$\mathbb{A}$	1.41421 35624	[1; 2, 2, 2, 2, 2, 2, 2, 2, 2, 2, 2, 2, 2, 2, 2, 2, 2, 2, 2, 2, …]	The convergents are ratios of successive Pell numbers.
Two	2	$\mathbb{N}$	2.00000 00000	[2; ]	
Euler's number	$e$	$\mathbb{R} \setminus \mathbb{A}$	2.71828 18285	[2; 1, 2, 1, 1, 4, 1, 1, 6, 1, 1, 8, 1, 1, 10, 1, 1, 12, 1, 1, 14, …] (Note: OEIS: A003417)	The continued fraction expansion has the pattern [2; 1, 2, 1, 1, 4, 1, ..., 1, 2n, 1, ...].
Khinchin's constant	$K_0$		2.68545 20011	[2; 1, 2, 5, 1, 1, 2, 1, 1, 3, 10, 2, 1, 3, 2, 24, 1, 3, 2, 3, 1, …] (Note: OEIS: A002211)	For almost all real numbers x, the coefficients of the continued fraction of x have a finite geometric mean known as Khinchin's constant.
Three	3	$\mathbb{N}$	3.00000 00000	[3; ]	
Pi	$\pi$	$\mathbb{R} \setminus \mathbb{A}$	3.14159 26536	[3; 7, 15, 1, 292, 1, 1, 1, 2, 1, 3, 1, 14, 2, 1, 1, 2, 2, 2, 2, 1, …] (Note: OEIS: A001203)	The first few convergents (3, 22/7, 333/106, 355/113, ...) are among the best-known and most widely used historical approximations of π.

== Sequences of constants ==
Name	Symbol	Formula	Year	Set
Harmonic number	$H_n$	$\sum^n_{k=1}\frac{1}{k}$	Antiquity	$\mathbb{Q}$
Gregory coefficients	$G_n$	$\frac 1 {n!} \int_0^1 x(x-1)(x-2)\cdots(x-n+1)\, dx = \int_0^1 \binom x n \, dx$	1670	$\mathbb{Q}$
Bernoulli number	$B^\pm_n$	$\frac{t}{2} \left( \operatorname{coth} \frac{t}{2} \pm 1 \right) = \sum_{m=0}^\infty \frac{B^{\pm{}}_m t^m}{m!}$	1689	$\mathbb{Q}$
Root of unity	$\zeta_n$	$\exp(\frac{2k\pi i}{n})$	Before 1722	$\mathbb{A}$
Hermite constants	$\gamma_{n}$	For a lattice L in Euclidean space R^{n} with unit covolume, i.e. vol(R^{n}/L) = 1, let λ_{1}(L) denote the least length of a nonzero element of L. Then √γ_{n}n is the maximum of λ_{1}(L) over all such lattices L.	1822 to 1901	$\mathbb{R}$
Hafner–Sarnak–McCurley constant	$D(n)$	$D(n)= \prod^\infty_{k=1}\left\{1-\left[1-\prod^n_{j=1}(1-p_k^{-j}) \right]^2 \right\}$	1883	$\mathbb{R}$
Stieltjes constants	$\gamma_n$	${\frac {(-1)^{n}n!}{2\pi }}\int _{0}^{{2\pi }}e^{{-nix}}\zeta \left(e^{{ix}}+1\right)dx$	before 1894	$\mathbb{R}$
Favard constants	$K_{r}$	$\frac{4}{\pi}\sum_{n = 0}^\infty \left(\frac{(-1)^n}{2n+1} \right)^{\!r+1}=\frac{4}{\pi}\left( \frac{(-1)^{0(r+1)}}{1^r}+\frac{(-1)^{1(r+1)}}{3^r}+\frac{(-1)^{2(r+1)}}{5^r}+\frac{(-1)^{3(r+1)}}{7^r}+\cdots\right)$	1902 to 1965	$\mathbb{R}$
Generalized Brun's Constant	$B_{n}$	${\sum \limits_p \left(\frac1{p} + \frac1{p+n}\right)}$ where the sum ranges over all primes p such that p + n is also a prime	1919	$\mathbb{R}$
Champernowne constants	$C_{b}$	Defined by concatenating representations of successive integers in base b $C_b=\sum^\infty_{n=1}\frac{n}{b^{\left(\sum^n_{k=1}\lceil\log_b(k+1)\rceil\right)}}$	1933	$\mathbb{R} \setminus \mathbb{A}$
Lagrange number	$L(n)$	$\sqrt{9-\frac{4}{{m_n}^2}}$ where $m_n$ is the nth smallest number such that $m^2+x^2+y^2=3mxy\,$ has positive (x,y)	before 1957	$\mathbb{A}$
Feller's coin-tossing constants	$\alpha_k,\beta_k$	$\alpha_k$ is the smallest positive real root of $x^{k+1}=2^{k+1}(x-1),\beta_k=\frac{2-\alpha_k}{k+1-k\alpha_k}$	1968	$\mathbb{A}$
Stoneham number	$\alpha_{b,c}$	$\sum_{n=c^k>1} \frac{1}{b^nn} = \sum_{k=1}^\infty \frac{1}{b^{c^k}c^k}$ where b,c are coprime integers	1973	$\mathbb{R} \setminus \mathbb{A}$
Beraha constants	$B(n)$	$2+2\cos\left(\frac{2\pi}{n}\right)$	1974	$\mathbb{A}$
Chvátal–Sankoff constants	$\gamma_k$	$\lim_{n\to\infty}\frac{E[\lambda_{n,k}]}{n}$	1975	$\mathbb{R}$
Hyperharmonic number	$H^{(r)}_n$	$\sum^n_{k=1}H^{(r-1)}_k$ and $H^{(0)}_n=\frac{1}{n}$	1995	$\mathbb{Q}$
Gregory number	$G_x$	$\sum _{n=0}^{\infty }(-1)^{n}{\frac {1}{(2n+1)x^{2n+1}}}=\arccot(x)$ for rational x greater than or equal to one	before 1996	$\mathbb{R} \setminus \mathbb{A}$
Metallic mean		$\frac{n+\sqrt{n^2+4}}{2}$	before 1998	$\mathbb{A}$

== See also ==
- Invariant (mathematics)
- Glossary of mathematical symbols
- List of mathematical symbols by subject
- List of numbers
- List of physical constants
- Particular values of the Riemann zeta function
- Particular values of the gamma function
- Physical constant

== Bibliography ==
- Arndt, Jörg; Haenel, Christoph (2006). Pi Unleashed. Springer-Verlag. ISBN 978-3-540-66572-4. English translation by Catriona and David Lischka.
- Jensen, Johan Ludwig William Valdemar (1895), "Note numéro 245. Deuxième réponse. Remarques relatives aux réponses du MM. Franel et Kluyver", L'Intermédiaire des Mathématiciens, II: 346–347
- Cuyt, Annie A.M.; Petersen, Vigdis; Verdonk, Brigitte; Waadeland, Haakon; Jones, William B. (2008). "Mathematical constants". Handbook of Continued Fractions for Special Functions. Dordrecht, Netherlands: Springer Science + Business Media. ISBN 9781402069499.
- Borwein, Jonathan; van der Poorten, Alf; Shallit, Jeffrey; Zudilin, Wadim (2014). Neverending Fractions: An Introduction to Continued Fractions. Australian Mathematical Society Lecture Series. Vol. 23. Cambridge, United Kingdom: Cambridge University Press. ISBN 9780521186490. ISSN 0950-2815.
