= Gauss–Kuzmin–Wirsing operator =

Mathematical concept

In mathematics, the Gauss–Kuzmin–Wirsing operator is the transfer operator of the Gauss map that takes a positive number to the fractional part of its reciprocal. (This is not the same as the Gauss map in differential geometry.) It is named after Carl Gauss, Rodion Kuzmin, and Eduard Wirsing. It occurs in the study of continued fractions; it is also related to the Riemann zeta function.

== Relationship to the maps and continued fractions ==
=== The Gauss map ===
Gauss function

The Gauss function (map) h is :

$$h(x)=1/x-\lfloor 1/x \rfloor.$$

where $\lfloor 1/x \rfloor$ denotes the floor function.

It has an infinite number of jump discontinuities at x = 1/n, for positive integers n. It is hard to approximate it by a single smooth polynomial.

=== Operator on the maps ===
The Gauss–Kuzmin–Wirsing operator $G$ acts on functions $f$ as

$$[Gf](x) = \int_0^1 \delta(x-h(y)) f(y) \, dy  = \sum_{n=1}^\infty \frac {1}{(x+n)^2} f \left(\frac {1}{x+n}\right).$$
it has the fixed point $\rho(x) = \frac{1}{\ln 2 (1+x)}$, unique up to scaling, which is the density of the measure invariant under the Gauss map.

=== Eigenvalues of the operator ===
The first eigenfunction of this operator is

$$\frac 1{\ln 2}\ \frac 1{1+x}$$

which corresponds to an eigenvalue of λ_{1} = 1. This eigenfunction gives the probability of the occurrence of a given integer in a continued fraction expansion, and is known as the Gauss–Kuzmin distribution. This follows in part because the Gauss map acts as a truncating shift operator for the continued fractions: if

$$x=[0;a_1,a_2,a_3,\dots]$$

is the continued fraction representation of a number 0 < x < 1, then

$$h(x)=[0;a_2,a_3,\dots].$$

Because $h$ is conjugate to a Bernoulli shift, the eigenvalue $\lambda_1=1$ is simple, and since the operator leaves invariant the Gauss–Kuzmin measure, the operator is ergodic with respect to the measure. This fact allows a short proof of the existence of Khinchin's constant.

Additional eigenvalues can be computed numerically; the next eigenvalue is λ_{2} = −0.3036630029... (sequence A038517 in the OEIS) and its absolute value is known as the Gauss–Kuzmin–Wirsing constant. Analytic forms for additional eigenfunctions are not known. It is not known if the eigenvalues are irrational.

Let us arrange the eigenvalues of the Gauss–Kuzmin–Wirsing operator according to an absolute value:

$$1=|\lambda_1|> |\lambda_2|\geq|\lambda_3|\geq\cdots.$$

It was conjectured in 1995 by Philippe Flajolet and Brigitte Vallée that

$$\lim_{n\to\infty} \frac{\lambda_n}{\lambda_{n+1}} = -\varphi^2, \text{ where } \varphi=\frac{1+\sqrt 5} 2.$$

In 2018, Giedrius Alkauskas gave a convincing argument that this conjecture can be refined to a much stronger statement:

$$\begin{align}
& (-1)^{n+1}\lambda_n=\varphi^{-2n} + C\cdot\frac{\varphi^{-2n}}{\sqrt{n}}+d(n)\cdot\frac{\varphi^{-2n}}{n}, \\[4pt]
& \text{where } C=\frac{\sqrt[4]{5}\cdot\zeta(3/2)}{2\sqrt{\pi}}=1.1019785625880999_{+};
\end{align}$$

here the function $d(n)$ is bounded, and $\zeta(\star)$ is the Riemann zeta function.

=== Continuous spectrum ===
The eigenvalues form a discrete spectrum, when the operator is limited to act on functions on the unit interval of the real number line. More broadly, since the Gauss map is the shift operator on Baire space $\mathbb{N}^\omega$, the GKW operator can also be viewed as an operator on the function space $\mathbb{N}^\omega\to\mathbb{C}$ (considered as a Banach space, with basis functions taken to be the indicator functions on the cylinders of the product topology). In the later case, it has a continuous spectrum, with eigenvalues in the unit disk $|\lambda|<1$ of the complex plane. That is, given the cylinder $C_n[b]= \{(a_1,a_2,\cdots) \in \mathbb{N}^\omega : a_n = b \}$, the operator G shifts it to the left: $GC_n[b] = C_{n-1}[b]$. Taking $r_{n,b}(x)$ to be the indicator function which is 1 on the cylinder (when $x\in C_n[b]$), and zero otherwise, one has that $Gr_{n,b}=r_{n-1,b}$. The series

$$f(x)=\sum_{n=1}^\infty \lambda^{n-1} r_{n,b}(x)$$

then is an eigenfunction with eigenvalue $\lambda$. That is, one has $[Gf](x)=\lambda f(x)$ whenever the summation converges: that is, when $|\lambda|<1$.

A special case arises when one wishes to consider the Haar measure of the shift operator, that is, a function that is invariant under shifts. This is given by the Minkowski measure $?^\prime$. That is, one has that $G?^\prime = ?^\prime$.

== Ergodicity ==
The Gauss map is in fact much more than ergodic: it is exponentially mixing, but the proof is not elementary.

=== Entropy ===
The Gauss map, over the Gauss measure, has entropy $\frac{\pi^2}{6\ln 2}$. This can be proved by the Rokhlin formula for entropy. Then using the Shannon–McMillan–Breiman theorem, with its equipartition property, we obtain Lochs' theorem.

=== Measure-theoretic preliminaries ===
A covering family $\mathcal C$ is a set of measurable sets, such that any open set is a disjoint union of sets in it. Compare this with base in topology, which is less restrictive as it allows non-disjoint unions.

Knopp's lemma. Let $B \subset [0, 1)$ be measurable, let $\mathcal C$ be a covering family and suppose that $\exists \gamma > 0, \forall A \in \mathcal C, \mu(A \cap B) \geq \gamma \mu(A)$. Then $\mu(B) = 1$.

Proof. Since any open set is a disjoint union of sets in $\mathcal C$, we have $\mu(A \cap B) \geq \gamma \mu(A)$ for any open set $A$, not just any set in $\mathcal C$.

Take the complement $B^c$. Since the Lebesgue measure is outer regular, we can take an open set $B'$ that is close to $B^c$, meaning the symmetric difference has arbitrarily small measure $\mu(B' \Delta B^c) < \epsilon$.

At the limit, $\mu(B' \cap B) \geq \gamma \mu(B')$ becomes have $0 \geq \gamma \mu(B^c)$.

=== The Gauss map is ergodic ===
Fix a sequence $a_1, \dots, a_n$ of positive integers. Let $\frac{q_n}{p_n} = [0;a_1, \dots, a_n]$. Let the interval $\Delta_n$ be the open interval with end-points $[0;a_1, \dots, a_n], [0;a_1, \dots, a_n+1]$.

Lemma. For any open interval $(a, b) \subset (0, 1)$, we have
$$\mu(T^{-n}(a,b) \cap \Delta_n) = \mu((a,b)) \mu(\Delta_n) \underbrace{\left(\frac{q_n(q_n + q_{n-1})}{(q_n + q_{n-1}b)(q_n + q_{n-1}a) } \right)}_{\geq 1/2}$$
Proof. For any $t \in (0, 1)$ we have $[0;a_1, \dots, a_n + t] = \frac{q_n + q_{n-1}t}{p_n + p_{n-1}t}$ by standard continued fraction theory. By expanding the definition, $T^{-n}(a,b) \cap \Delta_n$ is an interval with end points $[0;a_1, \dots, a_n + a], [0;a_1, \dots, a_n+ b]$. Now compute directly. To show the fraction is $\geq 1/2$, use the fact that $q_n \geq q_{n-1}$.

Theorem. The Gauss map is ergodic.

Proof. Consider the set of all open intervals in the form $([0;a_1, \dots, a_n], [0;a_1, \dots, a_n+1])$. Collect them into a single family $\mathcal C$. This $\mathcal C$ is a covering family, because any open interval $(a, b)\setminus \Q$ where $a, b$ are rational, is a disjoint union of finitely many sets in $\mathcal C$.

Suppose a set $B$ is $T$-invariant and has positive measure. Pick any $\Delta_n \in \mathcal C$. Since Lebesgue measure is outer regular, there exists an open set $B_0$ which differs from $B$ by only $\mu(B_0 \Delta B) < \epsilon$. Since $B$ is $T$-invariant, we also have $\mu(T^{-n}B_0 \Delta B) = \mu(B_0 \Delta B) < \epsilon$. Therefore,
$$\mu(T^{-n}B_0 \cap \Delta_n) \in \mu(B\cap \Delta_n) \pm \epsilon$$
By the previous lemma, we have
$$\mu(T^{-n}B_0 \cap \Delta_n) \geq \frac 12 \mu(B_0) \mu(\Delta_n) \in \frac 12 (\mu(B) \pm \epsilon) \mu(\Delta_n)$$
Take the $\epsilon \to 0$ limit, we have $\mu(B \cap \Delta_n) \geq \frac 12 \mu(B) \mu(\Delta_n)$. By Knopp's lemma, it has full measure.

== Relationship to the Riemann zeta function ==
The GKW operator is related to the Riemann zeta function. Note that the zeta function can be written as

$$\zeta(s)=\frac{1}{s-1}-s\int_0^1 h(x) x^{s-1} \; dx$$

which implies that

$$\zeta(s)=\frac{s}{s-1}-s\int_0^1 x \left[Gx^{s-1} \right]\, dx$$

by change-of-variable.

=== Matrix elements ===
Consider the Taylor series expansions at x = 1 for a function f(x) and $g(x)=[Gf](x)$. That is, let

$$f(1-x)=\sum_{n=0}^\infty (-x)^n \frac{f^{(n)}(1)}{n!}$$

and write likewise for g(x). The expansion is made about x = 1 because the GKW operator is poorly behaved at x = 0. The expansion is made about 1 − x so that we can keep x a positive number, 0 ≤ x ≤ 1. Then the GKW operator acts on the Taylor coefficients as

$$(-1)^m \frac{g^{(m)}(1)}{m!} = \sum_{n=0}^\infty G_{mn} (-1)^n \frac{f^{(n)}(1)}{n!},$$

where the matrix elements of the GKW operator are given by

$$G_{mn}=\sum_{k=0}^n (-1)^k {n \choose k} {k+m+1 \choose m} \left[ \zeta (k+m+2)- 1\right].$$

This operator is extremely well formed, and thus very numerically tractable. The Gauss–Kuzmin constant is easily computed to high precision by numerically diagonalizing the upper-left n by n portion. There is no known closed-form expression that diagonalizes this operator; that is, there are no closed-form expressions known for the eigenvectors.

=== Riemann zeta ===
The Riemann zeta can be written as

$$\zeta(s)=\frac{s}{s-1}-s \sum_{n=0}^\infty (-1)^n {s-1 \choose n} t_n$$

where the $t_n$ are given by the matrix elements above:

$$t_n=\sum_{m=0}^\infty \frac{G_{mn}} {(m+1)(m+2)}.$$

Performing the summations, one gets:

$$t_n=1-\gamma + \sum_{k=1}^n (-1)^k {n \choose k} \left[ \frac{1}{k} - \frac {\zeta(k+1)} {k+1} \right]$$

where $\gamma$ is the Euler–Mascheroni constant. These $t_n$ play the analog of the Stieltjes constants, but for the falling factorial expansion. By writing

$$a_n=t_n - \frac{1}{2(n+1)}$$

one gets: a_{0} = −0.0772156... and a_{1} = −0.00474863... and so on. The values get small quickly but are oscillatory. Some explicit sums on these values can be performed. They can be explicitly related to the Stieltjes constants by re-expressing the falling factorial as a polynomial with Stirling number coefficients, and then solving. More generally, the Riemann zeta can be re-expressed as an expansion in terms of Sheffer sequences of polynomials.

This expansion of the Riemann zeta is investigated in the following references. The coefficients are decreasing as
$$\left(\frac{2n}{\pi}\right)^{1/4}e^{-\sqrt{4\pi n}}
\cos\left(\sqrt{4\pi n}-\frac{5\pi}{8}\right) +
\mathcal{O} \left(\frac{e^{-\sqrt{4\pi n}}}{n^{1/4}}\right).$$

== General references ==
- A. Ya. Khinchin, Continued Fractions, 1935, English translation University of Chicago Press, 1961 ISBN 0-486-69630-8 (See section 15).
- K. I. Babenko, On a Problem of Gauss, Soviet Mathematical Doklady 19:136–140 (1978) MR 0472746
- K. I. Babenko and S. P. Jur'ev, On the Discretization of a Problem of Gauss, Soviet Mathematical Doklady 19:731–735 (1978). MR 0499751
- A. Durner, On a Theorem of Gauss–Kuzmin–Lévy. Arch. Math. 58, 251–256, (1992). MR 1148200
- A. J. MacLeod, High-Accuracy Numerical Values of the Gauss–Kuzmin Continued Fraction Problem. Computers Math. Appl. 26, 37–44, (1993).
- E. Wirsing, On the Theorem of Gauss–Kuzmin–Lévy and a Frobenius-Type Theorem for Function Spaces. Acta Arith. 24, 507–528, (1974). MR 0337868
