= Gauss–Kuzmin distribution =

Probability distribution in number theory

Gauss–Kuzmin
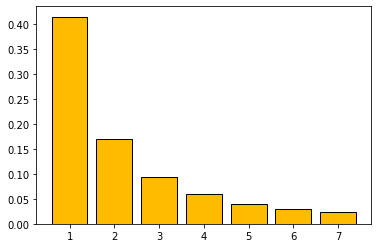
- Probability mass function

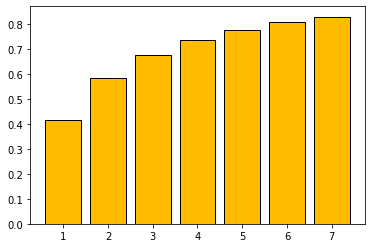
- Cumulative distribution function
- Parameters: (none)
- Support: $k \in \{1,2,\ldots\}$
- PMF: $$\begin{align}&-\log_2\left[ 1-\frac{1}{(k+1)^2}\right]\\ &= \log_2\left[ 1+\frac{1}{k(k+2)}\right]\end{align}$$
- CDF: $1 - \log_2\left(\frac{k+2}{k+1}\right)$
- Mean: $+\infty$
- Median: $2\,$
- Mode: $1\,$
- Variance: $+\infty$
- Skewness: undefined
- Excess kurtosis: undefined
- Entropy: 3.432527514776...

In mathematics, the Gauss–Kuzmin distribution is a discrete probability distribution that arises as the limit probability distribution of the coefficients in the continued fraction expansion of a random variable uniformly distributed in (0, 1). The distribution is named after Carl Friedrich Gauss, who derived it around 1800, and Rodion Kuzmin, who gave a bound on the rate of convergence in 1929. It is given by the probability mass function

$$p(k) = - \log_2 \left( 1 - \frac{1}{(k+1)^2}\right)~.$$

== Gauss–Kuzmin theorem ==
Let

$$x = \cfrac{1}{k_1 + \cfrac{1}{k_2 + \cdots}}$$

be the continued fraction expansion of a number x uniformly distributed in (0, 1). Then

$$\lim_{n \to \infty} \mathbb{P} \left\{ k_n = k \right\} = - \log_2\left(1 - \frac{1}{(k+1)^2}\right)~.$$

Equivalently, let

$$x_n = \cfrac{1}{k_{n+1} + \cfrac{1}{k_{n+2} + \cdots}}~;$$

then

$$\Delta_n(s) = \mathbb{P} \left\{ x_n \leq s \right\} - \log_2(1+s)$$

tends to zero as n tends to infinity.

== Rate of convergence ==
In 1928, Kuzmin gave the bound

$$|\Delta_n(s)| \leq C \exp(-\alpha \sqrt{n})~.$$

In 1929, Paul Lévy improved it to

$$|\Delta_n(s)| \leq C \, 0.7^n~.$$

Later, Eduard Wirsing showed that, for λ = 0.30366... (the Gauss–Kuzmin–Wirsing constant), the limit

$$\Psi(s) = \lim_{n \to \infty} \frac{\Delta_n(s)}{(-\lambda)^n}$$

exists for every s in [0, 1], and the function Ψ(s) is analytic and satisfies Ψ(0) = Ψ(1) = 0. Further bounds were proved by K. I. Babenko.

== See also ==
- Khinchin's constant
- Lévy's constant
