= Parabolic constant =

Parabolic constant can refer to:

- Universal parabolic constant, a mathematical constant
- Parabolic rate constant, a parameter of the Deal–Grove model
