= Khinchin's constant =

Mathematical constant in number theory

Geometric means of the continued fraction coefficients for $\pi$ (red), $\gamma$ (blue) and $\sqrt[3]{2}$ (green), conjectured to converge to Khinchin's constant (black).

In number theory, Khinchin's constant is a mathematical constant related to the simple continued fraction expansions of many real numbers. In particular Aleksandr Yakovlevich Khinchin proved that for almost all real numbers x, the coefficients a_{i} of the continued fraction expansion of x have a finite geometric mean that is independent of the value of x. It is known as Khinchin's constant and denoted by K_{0}.

That is, for

$$x = a_0+\cfrac{1}{a_1+\cfrac{1}{a_2+\cfrac{1}{a_3+\cfrac{1}{\ddots}}}}\;$$

it is almost always true that

$$\lim_{n \rightarrow \infty } \left( a_1 a_2 ... a_n \right) ^{1/n} =
K_0.$$

The decimal value of Khinchin's constant is given by:

$K_0 = 2.68545\, 20010 \, 65306\, 44530 \dots$ (sequence A002210 in the OEIS)

Although almost all numbers satisfy this property, it has not been proven for any real number not specifically constructed for the purpose. The following numbers whose continued fraction expansions apparently do have this property (based on empirical data) are:

- π
- Roots of equations with a degree > 2, e.g. cubic roots and quartic roots
- Natural logarithms, e.g. ln(2) and ln(3)
- The Euler-Mascheroni constant γ
- Apéry's constant ζ(3)
- The Feigenbaum constants δ and α
- Khinchin's constant itself (which would mean it is irrational)

Among the numbers x whose continued fraction expansions are known not to have this property are:

- Rational numbers
- Roots of quadratic equations, e.g. the square roots of integers and the golden ratio $\varphi$;
- The base of the natural logarithm e.

Khinchin is sometimes spelled Khintchine (the French transliteration of Russian Хинчин) in older mathematical literature.

== Series expressions ==
Khinchin's constant can be given by the following infinite product:

$$K_0=\prod_{r=1}^\infty {\left( 1+{1\over r(r+2)}\right)}^{\log_2 r}$$

This implies:

$$\ln K_0=\sum_{r=1}^\infty \ln{\left( 1+{1\over r(r+2)}\right)}{\log_2 r}$$

Khinchin's constant may also be expressed as a rational zeta series in the form

$$\ln K_0 = \frac{1}{\ln 2} \sum_{n=1}^\infty
\frac {\zeta (2n)-1}{n} \sum_{k=1}^{2n-1} \frac{(-1)^{k+1}}{k}$$

or, by peeling off terms in the series,

$$\ln K_0 = \frac{1}{\ln 2} \left[
-\sum_{k=2}^N \ln \left(\frac{k-1}{k} \right) \ln \left(\frac{k+1}{k} \right)
+ \sum_{n=1}^\infty
\frac {\zeta (2n,N+1)}{n} \sum_{k=1}^{2n-1} \frac{(-1)^{k+1}}{k}
\right]$$

where N is an integer, held fixed, and ζ(s, n) is the complex Hurwitz zeta function. Both series are strongly convergent, as ζ(n) − 1 approaches zero quickly for large n. An expansion may also be given in terms of the dilogarithm:

$$\ln \frac{K_0}{2} = \frac{1}{\ln 2} \left[
\mbox{Li}_2 \left( \frac{-1}{2} \right) +
\frac{1}{2}\sum_{k=2}^\infty (-1)^k \mbox{Li}_2 \left( \frac{4}{k^2} \right)
\right].$$

== Integrals ==
There exist a number of integrals related to Khinchin's constant:

$$\int_0^1 \frac{\log_2 \lfloor x^{-1} \rfloor}{x+1} dx = \ln {K_0}$$

$$\int_0^1 \frac{\log_2(\Gamma(2+x)\Gamma(2-x))}{x(x+1)} dx = \ln K_0-\ln2$$

$$\int_0^1 \frac{1}{x(x+1)}\log_2\left(\frac{\pi x (1-x^2)}{\sin \pi x}\right) dx = \ln K_0 - \ln2$$

$$\int_0^\pi \frac{\log_2(x|\cot x|)}{x} dx = \ln K_0 - \frac12\ln2 - \frac{\pi^2}{12\ln 2}$$

== Sketch of proof ==
The proof presented here was arranged by Czesław Ryll-Nardzewski and is much simpler than Khinchin's original proof which did not use ergodic theory.

Since the first coefficient a_{0} of the continued fraction of x plays no role in Khinchin's theorem and since the rational numbers have Lebesgue measure zero, we are reduced to the study of irrational numbers in the unit interval, i.e., those in $I=[0,1]\setminus\mathbb{Q}$. These numbers are in bijection with infinite continued fractions of the form [0; a_{1}, a_{2}, ...], which we simply write [a_{1}, a_{2}, ...], where a_{1}, a_{2}, ... are positive integers. Define a transformation T:I → I by

$$T([a_1,a_2,\dots])=[a_2,a_3,\dots].\,$$

The transformation T is called the Gauss–Kuzmin–Wirsing operator. For every Borel subset E of I, we also define the Gauss–Kuzmin measure of E

$$\mu(E)=\frac{1}{\ln 2}\int_E\frac{dx}{1+x}.$$

Then μ is a probability measure on the σ-algebra of Borel subsets of I. The measure μ is equivalent to the Lebesgue measure on I, but it has the additional property that the transformation T preserves the measure μ. Moreover, it can be proved that T is an ergodic transformation of the measurable space I endowed with the probability measure μ (this is the hard part of the proof). The ergodic theorem then says that for any μ-integrable function f on I, the average value of $f \left( T^k x \right)$ is the same for almost all $x$:

$$\lim_{n\to\infty} \frac 1n\sum_{k=0}^{n-1}(f\circ T^k)(x)=\int_I f d\mu\quad\text{for }\mu\text{-almost all }x\in I.$$

Applying this to the function defined by f([a_{1}, a_{2}, ...]) = ln(a_{1}), we obtain that

$$\lim_{n\to\infty}\frac 1n\sum_{k=1}^{n}\ln a_k=\int_I f \, d\mu = \sum_{r=1}^\infty\ln\left[1+\frac{1}{r(r+2)}\right]\log_2r$$

for almost all [a_{1}, a_{2}, ...] in I as n → ∞.

Taking the exponential on both sides, we obtain to the left the geometric mean of the first n coefficients of the continued fraction, and to the right Khinchin's constant.

== Generalizations ==
The Khinchin constant can be viewed as the first in a series of the Hölder means of the terms of continued fractions. Given an arbitrary series {a_{n}}, the Hölder mean of order p of the series is given by

$$K_p=\lim_{n\to\infty} \left[\frac{1}{n}
\sum_{k=1}^n a_k^p \right]^{1/p}.$$

When the {a_{n}} are the terms of a continued fraction expansion, the constants are given by

$$K_p=\left[\sum_{k=1}^\infty -k^p
\log_2\left( 1-\frac{1}{(k+1)^2} \right)
\right]^{1/p}.$$

This is obtained by taking the p-th mean in conjunction with the Gauss–Kuzmin distribution. This is finite when $p < 1$.

The arithmetic average diverges: $\lim_{n\to\infty}\frac 1n \sum_{k=1}^n a_k = K_1 = +\infty$, and so the coefficients grow arbitrarily large: $\limsup_n a_n = +\infty$.

The value for K_{0} is obtained in the limit of p → 0.

The harmonic mean (p = −1) is

$K_{-1}=1.74540566240\dots$ (sequence A087491 in the OEIS).

== Open problems ==
The limits for $\sin1$ (green), $e$ (red), $\sqrt{31}$ (blue) and a constructed number (yellow).

Many well-known numbers, such as π, the Euler–Mascheroni constant γ, and Khinchin's constant itself, based on numerical evidence, are thought to be among the numbers for which the limit $\lim_{n \rightarrow \infty } \left( a_1 a_2 ... a_n \right) ^{1/n}$ converges to Khinchin's constant. However, none of these limits has been rigorously established. In fact, it has not been proven for any real number which was not specifically constructed for that exact purpose.

The algebraic properties of Khinchin's constant itself, e. g. whether it is a rational, algebraic irrational, or transcendental number, are also not known.

== See also ==
- Lochs' theorem
- Lévy's constant
- Somos' constant
- List of mathematical constants
