= Eduard Wirsing =

German mathematician (1931–2022)

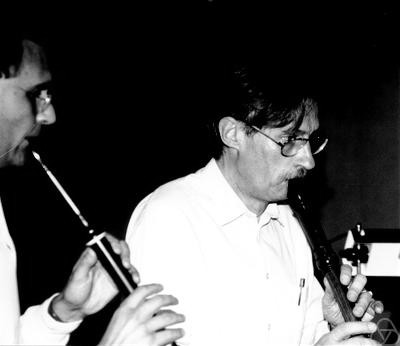
Eduard Wirsing

Eduard Wirsing (28 June 1931 – 22 March 2022) was a German mathematician, specializing in number theory.

== Biography ==
Wirsing was born on 28 June 1931 in Berlin.

Wirsing studied at the University of Göttingen and the Free University of Berlin, where he received his doctorate in 1957 under the supervision of Hans-Heinrich Ostmann with thesis Über wesentliche Komponenten in der additiven Zahlentheorie (On Essential Components in Additive Number Theory). In 1967/68 he was a professor at Cornell University and from 1969 a full professor at the University of Marburg, where he was since 1965. In 1970/71 he was at the Institute for Advanced Study. Since 1974 he was a professor at the University of Ulm, where he led the 1976 Mathematical Colloquium. He retired as professor emeritus in 1999, but continued to be mathematically active.

Wirsing organized conferences on analytical number theory at the Oberwolfach Research Institute for Mathematics.

In his spare time he played go and chess, played alto recorder, and made electronic devices.

Wirsing died on 22 March 2022.

== Research ==
In 1960 he proved for algebraic number fields a generalization of Roth's 1955 Thue-Siegel-Roth theorem:

Let $\alpha$ be algebraic of degree $\geq 3$, then there are only finitely many algebraic numbers $\beta$ of degree n, so that

$\left|\alpha - \beta \right| < H (\beta)^{-(2 n + \varepsilon)}$ for arbitrarily small positive $\varepsilon$, where $H(\beta)$ is the height of $\beta$.

The exponent on the right was improved to n+1 (replacing 2n) by Wolfgang M. Schmidt in 1970.

In 1961 Wirsing proved a theorem about the asymptotic means of non-negative multiplicative functions, and he was able to show, under certain conditions, that these are essentially determined by their values at the prime numbers (and not also by values at the higher prime exponents). In 1967 he sharpened his theorem and proved a conjecture of Paul Erdős (each multiplicative function, which takes only the values 1 and $-1$, has an average value).

In 1956, with Alfred Stöhr, Wirsing gave simpler examples (than the example given by Yuri Linnik in 1942) demonstrating that there are essential components that are not additive bases.

In 1957 he, with Bernhard Hornfeck, gave an asymptotic estimate for the density of perfect numbers. In 1959 Wirsing gave an asymptotic estimate for the density of multiply perfect numbers.

He gave in 1962 an elementary proof of a sharpened form of the prime-number theorem (with remainder). (In this context, "elementary" means "not using methods from complex function theory".) About the same time, similar results were published by Robert Breusch (1960) and Enrico Bombieri (1962). Elementary proofs of the prime number theorem were first published by Paul Erdős and Atle Selberg in 1949.

Wirsing is also known for his work on the Gauss-Kuzmin-Lévy distribution (named after Carl Friedrich Gauss, Rodion Kuzmin, Paul Lévy). He gave asymptotic estimates for the distribution of the coefficients of the regular continued fraction evolution of a random variable evenly distributed in the unit interval. In this context, he also introduced a universal mathematical constant (Gauss-Kuzmin-Wirsing constant).

== Selected publications ==
- Approximation mit algebraischen Zahlen beschränkten Grades, Journal für die Reine und Angewandte Mathematik, vol. 206, 1961, pp. 67–77
- "Das asymptotische Verhalten von Summen über multiplikative Funktionen". Mathematische Annalen (in German). 143: 7–103. 1961. Part 2 in Acta Math. Acad. Sci. Hungar. 18, 1967, 411–447
- "Elementare Beweise des Primzahlsatzes mit Restglied, Part 1". Journal für die Reine und Angewandte Mathematik (in German). 211: 205–214. 1962. (Part 2 vol. 214/215, 1964, pp. 1–18)
- with Alan Baker, Bryan Birch On a problem of Chowla, J. Number Theory, Vol. 5, 1973, pp. 224–236
