= Hafner–Sarnak–McCurley constant =

In mathematics, the Hafner–Sarnak–McCurley constant is a constant representing the probability that the determinants of two randomly chosen $n\times n$ integer matrices will be relatively prime. It is given by the formula

$$\Delta(n) = \prod_{k=1}^{\infty}\left[1-\bigg(1-\prod_{j=1}^n(1-p_k^{-j})\bigg)^2\right],$$

where $p_k$ is the $k$th prime number. The limiting value is

$\lim_{n\to\infty} \Delta(n) = 0.3532363719\dots$ (sequence A085849 in the OEIS).

- Finch, Steven R. (2003). Mathematical Constants. Encyclopedia of Mathematics and Its Applications. Vol. 94. Cambridge University Press. ISBN 0-521-81805-2.
- Flajolet, P. & Vardi, I. (1996), "Zeta Function Expansions of Classical Constants", Unpublished manuscript
- Hafner, James Lee; Sarnak, Peter; McCurley, Kevin (1993). "Relatively prime values of polynomials". In Knopp, Marvin; Sheingorn, Mark (eds.). A Tribute to Emil Grosswald: Number Theory and Related Analysis. Contemporary Mathematics. Vol. 143. Providence, RI: American Mathematical Society. pp. 437–443. ISBN 0-8218-5155-1. MR 1210531.
- Vardi, Ilan (1991). Computational Recreations in Mathematica. Redwood City, CA: Addison–Wesley. ISBN 0-201-52989-0.
