= Bernstein's constant =

Mathematical constant

Bernstein's constant, usually denoted by the Greek letter β (beta), is a mathematical constant named after Sergei Natanovich Bernstein and is equal to 0.2801694990... .

== Definition ==
Let E_{n}(ƒ) be the error of the best uniform approximation to a real function ƒ(x) on the interval [−1, 1] by real polynomials of no more than degree n. In the case of ƒ(x) = |x|, Bernstein showed that the limit

$$\beta=\lim_{n \to \infty}2nE_{2n}(f),\,$$

called Bernstein's constant, exists and is between 0.278 and 0.286. His conjecture that the limit is:

$$\frac {1}{2\sqrt {\pi}}=0.28209\dots\,.$$

was disproven by Varga and Carpenter, who calculated

$$\beta=0.280169499023\dots\,.$$
