= Beraha constants =

Mathematical constants

The Beraha constants are a sequence of mathematical constants of the form

$$B (n) = 2 + 2 \cos \left ( \frac{2\pi}{n} \right ).$$

Notable examples of Beraha constants include $B (5)$ is $\varphi + 1$, where $\varphi$ is the golden ratio, $B (7)$ is the silver constant (also known as the silver root), and $B (10) = \varphi + 2$.

The following table summarizes the first ten Beraha constants.

$n$	$B(n)$	Approximately
1	4	
2	0	
3	1	
4	2	
5	$\frac{1}{2}(3+\sqrt{5})$	2.618
6	3	
7	$2 + 2 \cos (\tfrac{2}{7}\pi)$	3.247
8	$2 + \sqrt{2}$	3.414
9	$2 + 2 \cos (\tfrac{2}{9}\pi)$	3.532
10	$\frac{1}{2}(5+\sqrt{5})$	3.618

In October 2026, Reza Mactabi presented a proof in an arXiv preprint that every non-integer Beraha number is an accumulation point of real roots of the chromatic polynomials of simple plane triangulations. Wolfram MathWorld reports this result as proved by Mactabi.

== See also ==
- Chromatic polynomial
