= Backhouse's constant =

Mathematical constant

Backhouse's constant is a mathematical constant named after Nigel Backhouse. Its value is approximately 1.456074948.

It is defined by using the power series such that the coefficients of successive terms are the prime numbers,

$$P(x)=1+\sum_{k=1}^\infty p_k x^k=1+2x+3x^2+5x^3+7x^4+\cdots$$

and its multiplicative inverse as a formal power series,

$$Q(x)=\frac{1}{P(x)}=\sum_{k=0}^\infty q_k x^k.$$

Then:

$\lim_{k \to \infty}\left | \frac{q_{k+1}}{q_k} \right \vert = 1.45607\ldots$.

This limit was conjectured to exist by Backhouse, and later proven by Philippe Flajolet.
