= Sierpiński's constant =

Mathematical constant

Sierpiński's constant is a mathematical constant usually denoted as K. One way of defining it is as the following limit:

$$K=\lim_{n \to \infty}\left[\sum_{k=1}^{n}{r_2(k)\over k} - \pi\ln n\right]$$

where r_{2}(k) is a number of representations of k as a sum of the form a^{2} + b^{2} for integer a and b.

It can be given in closed form as:

$$\begin{align}
K &= \pi \left(2 \ln 2+3 \ln \pi + 2 \gamma - 4 \ln \Gamma \left(\tfrac{1}{4}\right)\right)\\
&=\pi \ln\left(\frac{4\pi^3 e^{2\gamma}}{\Gamma \left(\tfrac{1}{4}\right)^4}\right)\\
&=\pi \ln\left(\frac{\pi^2e^{2\gamma}}{2\varpi^2}\right)\\
&= 2.58498 17595 79253 21706 58935 87383\dots
\end{align}$$

where $\varpi$ is the lemniscate constant and $\gamma$ is the Euler-Mascheroni constant.

Another way to define/understand Sierpiński's constant is,

Graph of the given equation where the straight line represents Sierpiński's constant

Let r(n) denote the number of representations of $n$ by $k$ squares, then the Summatory Function of $r_2(k)/k$ has the Asymptotic expansion

$\sum_{k=1}^{n}{r_2(k)\over k}=K+\pi\ln n+o\!\left(\frac{1}{\sqrt n}\right)$,

where $K=2.5849817596$ is the Sierpiński constant. The above plot shows

$\left(\sum_{k=1}^{n}{r_2(k)\over k}\right)-\pi\ln n$,

with the value of $K$ indicated as the solid horizontal line.

== See also ==
- Wacław Sierpiński
