= Aleksandr Khinchin =

Russian mathematician

- Born: Aleksandr Yakovlevich Khinchin; July 19, 1894; Kondrovo, Kaluga Governorate, Russian Empire
- Died: November 18, 1959 (aged 65); Moscow, Russian SFSR, Soviet Union
- Education: Moscow State University
- Scientific career
- Fields: Mathematics
- Workplaces: Moscow State University
- Doctoral advisor: Nikolai Luzin
- Doctoral students: Alexander Buchstab; Alexander Gelfond

Aleksandr Yakovlevich Khinchin (Russian: Алекса́ндр Я́ковлевич Хи́нчин, French: Alexandre Khintchine; July 19, 1894 – November 18, 1959) was a Soviet mathematician and one of the most significant contributors to the Soviet school of probability theory.

Due to romanization conventions, his name is sometimes written as "Khinchin" and other times as "Khintchine".

== Life and career ==
He was born in the village of Kondrovo, Kaluga Governorate, Russian Empire. While studying at Moscow State University, he became one of the first followers of the famous Luzin school. Khinchin graduated from the university in 1916 and six years later he became a full professor there, retaining that position until his death.

Khinchin's early works focused on real analysis. Later he applied methods from the metric theory of functions to problems in probability theory and number theory. He became one of the founders of modern probability theory, discovering the law of the iterated logarithm in 1924, achieving important results in the field of limit theorems, giving a definition of a stationary process and laying a foundation for the theory of such processes.

Khinchin made significant contributions to the metric theory of Diophantine approximations and established an important result for simple real continued fractions, discovering a property of such numbers that leads to what is now known as Khinchin's constant. He also published several important works on statistical physics, where he used the methods of probability theory, and on information theory, queuing theory and mathematical analysis.

In 1939 Khinchin was elected as a Correspondent Member of the Academy of Sciences of the USSR. He was awarded the USSR State Prize (1941), and the Order of Lenin.

== Bibliography ==
- Sur la Loi des Grandes Nombres, in Comptes Rendus de l'Académie des Sciences, Paris, 1929
- Asymptotische Gesetze der Wahrscheinlichkeitsrechnung, Berlin: Julius Springer, 1933
- Continued Fractions, Mineola, N.Y. : Dover Publications, 1997, ISBN 0-486-69630-8 (first published in Moscow, 1935)
- Three Pearls of Number Theory, Mineola, NY : Dover Publications, 1998, ISBN 0-486-40026-3 (first published in Moscow and Leningrad, 1947)
- Mathematical Foundations of Quantum Statistics, Mineola, N.Y. : Dover Publications, 1998, ISBN 0-486-40025-5 (first published in Moscow and Leningrad, 1951; trans. in 1960 by Irwin Shapiro)
- Mathematical Foundations of Information Theory, Dover Publications, 1957, ISBN 9780486604343

== See also ==
- Pollaczek–Khinchine formula
- Wiener–Khinchin theorem
- Khinchin inequality
- Equidistribution theorem
- Khinchin's constant
- Khinchin–Lévy constant
- Khinchin's theorem on Diophantine approximations
- Law of the iterated logarithm
- Palm-Khintchine Theorem
- Weak law of large numbers (Khinchin's law)
- Lévy–Khintchine formula of characteristic function of Lévy process
