= Lévy's constant =

Mathematical constant in continued fractions

In mathematics Lévy's constant (sometimes known as the Khinchin–Lévy constant) occurs in an expression for the asymptotic behaviour of the denominators of the convergents of simple continued fractions. In 1935, the Soviet mathematician Aleksandr Khinchin showed that the denominators q_{n} of the convergents of the continued fraction expansions of almost all real numbers satisfy
$$\lim_{n \to \infty}{q_n}^{1/n}= e^{\beta}$$
Soon afterward, in 1936, the French mathematician Paul Lévy found the explicit expression for the constant, namely

$e^{\beta} = e^{\pi^2/(12\ln2)} = 3.275822918721811159787681882\ldots$ (sequence A086702 in the OEIS)

The term "Lévy's constant" is sometimes used to refer to $\pi^2/(12\ln2)$ (the logarithm of the above expression), which is approximately equal to 1.1865691104… The value derives from the asymptotic expectation of the logarithm of the ratio of successive denominators, using the Gauss-Kuzmin distribution. In particular, the ratio has the asymptotic density function

$f(z)=\frac{1}{z(z+1)\ln(2)}$

for $z \geq 1$ and zero otherwise. This gives Lévy's constant as

$\beta=\int_1^\infty\frac{\ln z}{z(z+1)\ln 2}dz=\int_0^1\frac{\ln z^{-1}}{(z+1)\ln 2}dz=\frac{\pi^2}{12\ln 2}$.

The base-10 logarithm of Lévy's constant, which is approximately 0.51532041…, is half of the reciprocal of the limit in Lochs' theorem.

== Proof ==
The proof assumes basic properties of continued fractions.

Let $T : x \mapsto 1/x \mod 1$ be the Gauss map.

=== Lemma ===
$$|\ln x - \ln p_n(x)/q_n(x)| \leq 1/q_n(x) \leq 1/F_n$$
where $F_n$ is the Fibonacci number.

Proof. Define the function $f(t) = \ln\frac{p_n + p_{n-1}t}{q_n + q_{n-1}t}$. The quantity to estimate is then $|f(T^n x) - f(0)|$.

By the mean value theorem, for any $t\in [0, 1]$,
$$|f(t)-f(0)| \leq \max_{t \in [0, 1]}|f'(t)| = \max_{t \in [0, 1]} \frac{1}{(p_n + tp_{n-1})(q_n + tq_{n-1})} = \frac{1}{p_nq_n} \leq \frac{1}{q_n}$$
The denominator sequence $q_{0}, q_1, q_2, \dots$ satisfies a recurrence relation, and so it is at least as large as the Fibonacci sequence $1, 1, 2, \dots$.

=== Ergodic argument ===
Since $p_n(x) = q_{n-1}(Tx)$, and $p_1 = 1$, we have
$$-\ln q_n = \ln\frac{p_n(x)}{q_n(x)} + \ln\frac{p_{n-1}(Tx)}{q_{n-1}(Tx)} + \dots + \ln\frac{p_1(T^{n-1}x)}{q_1(T^{n-1} x)}$$
By the lemma,
$$-\ln q_n = \ln x + \ln Tx + \dots + \ln T^{n-1}x + \delta$$

where $|\delta| \leq \sum_{k=1}^\infty 1/F_k$ is finite, and is called the reciprocal Fibonacci constant.

By Birkhoff's ergodic theorem, the limit $\lim_{n \to \infty}\frac{\ln q_n}{n}$ converges to
$$\int_0^1 ( -\ln t )\rho(t) dt = \frac{\pi^2}{12\ln 2}$$
almost surely, where $\rho(t) = \frac{1}{(1+t) \ln 2}$ is the Gauss distribution.

== See also ==
- Khinchin's constant
