= Foias constant =

Mathematical constant

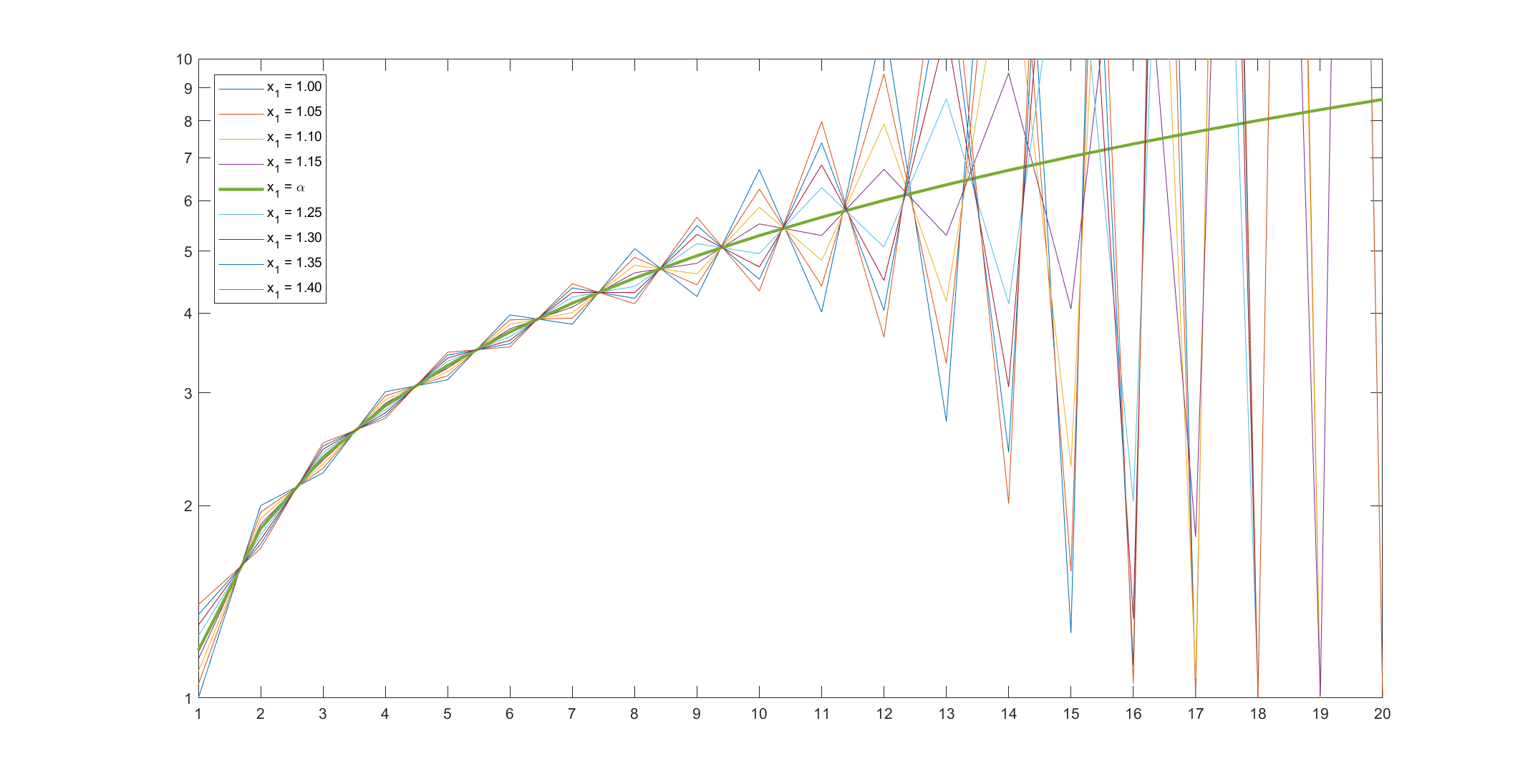
Evolution of the sequence $x_{n+1} = (1 + 1/x_n)^n$ for several values of $x_1$, around the Foias constant $\alpha$. Evolution for $x_1 = \alpha$ is in green. Other initial values lead to two accumulation points, 1 and $\infty$. A logarithmic scale is used.

In mathematical analysis, the Foias constant is a real number named after Ciprian Foias.

It is defined in the following way: for every real number x_{1} > 0, there is a sequence defined by the recurrence relation

$$x_{n+1} = \left( 1 + \frac{1}{x_n} \right)^n$$

for n = 1, 2, 3, .... The Foias constant is the unique choice α such that if x_{1} = α then the sequence diverges to infinity. For all other values of x_{1}, the sequence is divergent as well, but it has two accumulation points: 1 and infinity. Numerically, it is

$\alpha = 1.187452351126501\ldots$.

The constant can be computed by solving backwards: $x_{n} = \frac{1}{\sqrt[n]{x_{n+1}} - 1}$

This recursion converges for any starting value $x_n\ne 0$.

When x_{1} = α then the growth rate of the sequence (x_{n}) is given by the limit

$$\lim_{n\to\infty} x_n \frac{\log n}n = 1,$$

where "log" denotes the natural logarithm.

The same methods used in the proof of the uniqueness of the Foias constant may also be applied to other similar recursive sequences.

== See also ==
- Mathematical constant

== Notes and references ==
- S. R. Finch (2003). Mathematical Constants. Cambridge University Press. p. 430. ISBN 0-521-818-052. "Foias constant."
