= Rodion Kuzmin =

Russian mathematician

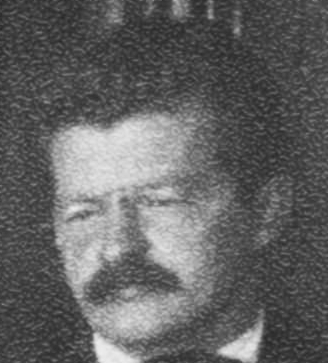
- Rodion Kusmin, circa 1926
- Born: 9 October 1891; Riabye village in the Haradok district
- Died: 24 March 1949 (aged 57); Leningrad
- Education: Saint Petersburg State University nee Petrograd University
- Known for: Gauss–Kuzmin distribution, number theory and mathematical analysis.
- Scientific career
- Fields: Mathematics
- Workplaces: Perm State University, Tomsk Polytechnic University, Saint Petersburg State Polytechnical University
- Doctoral advisor: James Victor Uspensky

Rodion Osievich Kuzmin (Russian: Родион Осиевич Кузьмин, 9 November 1891, Riabye village in the Haradok district – 24 March 1949, Leningrad) was a Soviet mathematician, known for his works in number theory and analysis. His name is sometimes transliterated as Kusmin. He was an Invited Speaker of the ICM in 1928 in Bologna.

== Selected results ==
- In 1928, Kuzmin solved the following problem due to Gauss (see Gauss–Kuzmin distribution): if x is a random number chosen uniformly in (0, 1), and

$$x = \frac{1}{k_1 + \frac{1}{k_2 + \cdots}}$$

is its continued fraction expansion, find a bound for

$$\Delta_n(s) = \mathbb{P} \left\{ x_n \leq s \right\} - \log_2(1+s),$$

where

$$x_n = \frac{1}{k_{n+1} + \frac{1}{k_{n+2} + \cdots}} .$$

Gauss showed that Δ_{n} tends to zero as n goes to infinity, however, he was unable to give an explicit bound. Kuzmin showed that

$$|\Delta_n(s)| \leq  C e^{- \alpha \sqrt{n}}~,$$

where C,α > 0 are numerical constants. In 1929, the bound was improved to C 0.7^{n} by Paul Lévy.

- In 1930, Kuzmin proved that numbers of the form a^{b}, where a is algebraic and b is a real quadratic irrational, are transcendental. In particular, this result implies that Gelfond–Schneider constant

$$2^{\sqrt{2}}=2.6651441426902251886502972498731\ldots$$

is transcendental. See Gelfond–Schneider theorem for later developments.

- He is also known for the Kusmin-Landau inequality: If $f$ is continuously differentiable with monotonic derivative $f'$ satisfying $\Vert f'(x) \Vert \geq \lambda > 0$ (where $\Vert \cdot \Vert$ denotes the Nearest integer function) on a finite interval $I$, then

$$\sum_{n\in I} e^{2\pi if(n)}\ll \lambda^{-1}.$$
