= Universal parabolic constant =

Mathematical constant in conic sections

The universal parabolic constant is the red length divided by the green length.

The universal parabolic constant is a mathematical constant.

It is defined as the ratio, for any parabola, of the arc length of the parabolic segment formed by the latus rectum to the focal parameter. The focal parameter is twice the focal length. The ratio is denoted P. In the diagram, the latus rectum is pictured in blue, the parabolic segment that it forms in red and the focal parameter in green. (The focus of the parabola is the point F and the directrix is the line L.)

The value of P is

$$P = \ln(1 + \sqrt2) + \sqrt2 = 2.29558714939\dots$$

(sequence A103710 in the OEIS). The circle and parabola are unique among conic sections in that they have a universal constant. The analogous ratios for ellipses and hyperbolas depend on their eccentricities. This means that all circles are similar and all parabolas are similar, whereas ellipses and hyperbolas are not.

== Derivation ==
Take $y = \frac{x^2}{4f}$ as the equation of the parabola. The focal parameter is $p=2f$ and the semilatus rectum is $\ell=2f$.
$$\begin{align}
P & := \frac{1}{p}\int_{-\ell}^\ell \sqrt{1+\left(y'(x)\right)^2}\, dx   \\
& = \frac{1}{2f}\int_{-2f}^{2f}\sqrt{1+\frac{x^2}{4f^2}}\, dx \\
& = \int_{-1}^{1}\sqrt{1+t^2}\, dt & (x = 2 f t) \\
& = \operatorname{arsinh}(1) + \sqrt{2}\\
& = \ln(1+\sqrt{2}) + \sqrt{2}.
\end{align}$$

== Properties ==
P is a transcendental number.

Proof. Suppose that P is algebraic. Then $\!\ P - \sqrt2 = \ln(1 + \sqrt2)$ must also be algebraic. However, by the Lindemann–Weierstrass theorem, $\!\ e^{\ln(1+ \sqrt2)} = 1 + \sqrt2$ would be transcendental, which is not the case. Hence P is transcendental.

Since P is transcendental, it is also irrational.

== Applications ==
The average distance from a point randomly selected in the unit square to its center is

$$d_\text{avg} = {P \over 6}.$$
Proof.
$$\begin{align}
d_\text{avg} & := 8\int_{0}^{1 \over 2}\int_{0}^{x}\sqrt{x^2+y^2}\, dy\, dx \\
& = 8\int_{0}^{1 \over 2}{1 \over 2}x^2(\ln(1 + \sqrt2) + \sqrt2)\, dx \\
& = 4P\int_{0}^{1 \over 2}x^2\, dx \\
& = {P \over 6}
\end{align}$$

There is also an interesting geometrical reason why this constant appears in unit squares. The average distance between a center of a unit square and a point on the square's boundary is ${P \over 4}$. If we uniformly sample every point on the perimeter of the square, take line segments (drawn from the center) corresponding to each point, add them together by joining each line segment next to the other, scaling them down, the curve obtained is a parabola.
