= Zeckendorf =

Zeckendorf may refer to:

- Edouard Zeckendorf, Belgian mathematician known for Zeckendorf's theorem
- Fritz Zeckendorf (1886–1943), Hungarian sceenwriter
- William Zeckendorf, Sr (1905-1976), American real estate developer
- William Zeckendorf, Jr. (1929-2014), real estate developer
- Zeckendorf Towers, a condominium in New York City
- Zeckendorf, Bavaria. a town near Bamberg, Bavaria.
- Louis Zeckendorf, American pioneer
- Zeckendorf v. Steinfeld, a case decided by the Supreme Court of the United States
