= Paola Loreti =

Italian mathematician

Paola Loreti is an Italian mathematician, and a professor of mathematical analysis at Sapienza University of Rome. She is known for her research on Fourier analysis, control theory, and non-integer representations. The Komornik–Loreti constant, the smallest non-integer base for which the representation of 1 is unique, is named after her and Vilmos Komornik.

Loreti earned a laurea from Sapienza University in 1984. Her dissertation, Programmazione dinamica ed equazione di Bellman [dynamic programming and the Bellman equation] was supervised by Italo Capuzzo-Dolcetta.

With Vilmos Komornik, Loreti is the author of the book Fourier Series in Control Theory (Springer, 2005).
