= Ostrowski numeration =

In mathematics, Ostrowski numeration, named after Alexander Ostrowski, is either of two related numeration systems based on continued fractions: a non-standard positional numeral system for integers and a non-integer representation of real numbers.

Fix a positive irrational number α with continued fraction expansion [a_{0}; a_{1}, a_{2}, ...]. Let (q_{n}) be the sequence of denominators of the convergents p_{n}/q_{n} to α: so q_{n} = a_{n}q_{n−1} + q_{n−2}. Let α_{n} denote T^{n}(α) where T is the Gauss map T(x) = {1/x}, and write β_{n} = (−1)^{n+1} α_{0} α_{1} ... α_{n}: we have β_{n} = a_{n}β_{n−1} + β_{n−2}.

== Real number representations ==
Every positive real x can be written as

$$x = \sum_{n=1}^\infty b_n \beta_n \$$

where the integer coefficients 0 ≤ b_{n} ≤ a_{n} and if b_{n} = a_{n} then b_{n−1} = 0.

== Integer representations ==
Every positive integer N can be written uniquely as

$$N = \sum_{n=1}^k b_n q_n \$$

where the integer coefficients 0 ≤ b_{n} ≤ a_{n} and if b_{n} = a_{n} then b_{n−1} = 0.

If α is the golden ratio, then all the partial quotients a_{n} are equal to 1, the denominators q_{n} are the Fibonacci numbers and we recover Zeckendorf's theorem on the Fibonacci representation of positive integers as a sum of distinct non-consecutive Fibonacci numbers.

== See also ==
- Complete sequence
