= Prouhet–Thue–Morse constant =

Mathematical constant

In mathematics, the Prouhet–Thue–Morse constant, named for Eugène Prouhet, Axel Thue, and Marston Morse, is the number—denoted by τ—whose binary expansion 0.01101001100101101001011001101001... is given by the Prouhet–Thue–Morse sequence. That is,

$$\tau = \sum_{n=0}^{\infty} \frac{t_n}{2^{n+1}} = 0.412454033640 \ldots$$

where t_{n} is the n^{th} element of the Prouhet–Thue–Morse sequence.

== Other representations ==
The Prouhet–Thue–Morse constant can also be expressed, without using t_{n} , as an infinite product,

$$\tau = \frac{1}{4}\left[2-\prod_{n=0}^{\infty}\left(1-\frac{1}{2^{2^n}}\right)\right]$$

This formula is obtained by substituting x = 1/2 into generating series for t_{n}

$$F(x) = \sum_{n=0}^{\infty} (-1)^{t_n} x^n = \prod_{n=0}^{\infty} ( 1 - x^{2^n} )$$

The continued fraction expansion of the constant is [0; 2, 2, 2, 1, 4, 3, 5, 2, 1, 4, 2, 1, 5, 44, 1, 4, 1, 2, 4, 1, …] (sequence A014572 in the OEIS)

Yann Bugeaud and Martine Queffélec showed that infinitely many partial quotients of this continued fraction are 4 or 5, and infinitely many partial quotients are greater than or equal to 50.

== Transcendence ==
The Prouhet–Thue–Morse constant was shown to be transcendental by Kurt Mahler in 1929.

He also showed that the number

$$\sum_{n=0}^{\infty} t_n \, \alpha^n$$

is also transcendental for any algebraic number α, where 0 < |α| < 1.

Yann Bugaeud proved that the Prouhet–Thue–Morse constant has an irrationality measure of 2.

== Appearances ==
The Prouhet–Thue–Morse constant appears in probability. If a language L over {0, 1} is chosen at random, by flipping a fair coin to decide whether each word w is in L, the probability that it contains at least one word for each possible length is

$$p = \prod_{n=0}^{\infty}\left(1-\frac{1}{2^{2^n}}\right) = \sum_{n=0}^{\infty} \frac{(-1)^{t_n}}{2^{n+1}} = 2 - 4 \tau = 0.35018386544\ldots$$

== See also ==
- Euler–Mascheroni constant
- Fibonacci word
- Golay–Rudin–Shapiro sequence
- Komornik–Loreti constant
