= Edouard Zeckendorf =

Edouard Zeckendorf (2 May 1901 – 16 May 1983) was a Belgian doctor, army officer and amateur mathematician. In mathematics, he is best known for his work on Fibonacci numbers and in particular for discovering (in 1939) and proving what is now known as Zeckendorf's theorem: every positive whole number is either a Fibonacci number or can be written as a sum of distinct non-consecutive Fibonacci numbers (and such a representation is unique).

== Early life ==
Zeckendorf was born in Liège in 1901, to Henriette van Gelder and Abraham Zeckendorf. His Jewish father was a Dutch dentist. In the years 1912-1919, he was a pupil at the Royal Athenaeum of Liege, where his studies included Latin, Greek, German, English, mathematics, and drawing. In 1925, Zeckendorf graduated as a medical doctor from the University of Liège and joined the Belgian Army medical corps.

== Career ==
Zeckendorf's entire career was spent in the army. He married Elsa Schwers in 1929, and by 1931 had added dental surgery to his qualifications.

Following the German invasion of Belgium in May 1940, Zeckendorf was taken prisoner and remained a prisoner of war until 1945. During this period, he provided medical care to other allied POWs.

Zeckendorf retired from the army in 1957 at the rank of colonel.

His wife Elsa had died in 1944, while he was still a POW. In 1959, he married Marie Jeanne Lempereur. She, too, predeceased him, in 1977.

== Mathematics ==
Starting after the war, Zeckendorf also published over 30 mathematical papers, for instance:

- "Étude fibonaccienne. Arrangements avec répétition de lettres a et de chaînes limitées de lettres b" (Mathesis.1949),
- "Étude fibonaccienne. De certaines coupes obliques parallèles dans les polytopes arithmétiques à (p−1) dimensions" (Mathesis, 1950),
- "Étude fibonaccienne" (Mathesis, 1951).

Many of his later papers appeared in the Bulletin de la Société Royale des Sciences de Liège.

In 1957, his work was recognised by the Societe Royale des Sciences de Liège when they elected him as an associate member.
