= Komornik–Loreti constant =

Mathematical constant of numeral systems

In the mathematical theory of non-standard positional numeral systems, the Komornik–Loreti constant is a mathematical constant that represents the smallest base q for which the number 1 has a unique representation, called its q-development. The constant is named after Vilmos Komornik and Paola Loreti, who defined it in 1998.

== Definition ==
Given a real number q > 1, the series

$$x = \sum_{n=0}^\infty a_n q^{-n}$$

is called the q-expansion, or $\beta$-expansion, of the positive real number x if, for all $n \ge 0$, $0 \le a_n \le \lfloor q \rfloor$, where $\lfloor q \rfloor$ is the floor function and $a_n$ need not be an integer. Any real number $x$ such that $0 \le x \le q \lfloor q \rfloor /(q-1)$ has such an expansion, as can be found using the greedy algorithm.

The special case of $x = 1$, $a_0 = 0$, and $a_n = 0$ or $1$ is sometimes called a $q$-development. $a_n = 1$ gives the only 2-development. However, for almost all $1 < q < 2$, there are an infinite number of different $q$-developments. Even more surprisingly though, there exist exceptional $q \in (1,2)$ for which there exists only a single $q$-development. Furthermore, there is a smallest number $1 < q < 2$ known as the Komornik–Loreti constant for which there exists a unique $q$-development.

== Value ==
The Komornik–Loreti constant is the value $q$ such that

$$1 = \sum_{k=1}^\infty \frac{t_k}{q^k}$$

where $t_k$ is the Thue–Morse sequence, i.e., $t_k$ is the parity of the number of 1's in the binary representation of $k$. It has approximate value

$q=1.787231650\ldots. \,$

The constant $q$ is also the unique positive real solution to the equation

$$\prod_{k=0}^\infty \left ( 1 - \frac{1}{q^{2^k}} \right ) = \left ( 1 - \frac{1}{q} \right )^{-1} - 2.$$

This constant is transcendental.

== See also ==
- Euler–Mascheroni constant
- Fibonacci word
- Golay–Rudin–Shapiro sequence
- Prouhet–Thue–Morse constant
