= Rationalisation (mathematics) =

Removal of square roots from denominators

In elementary algebra, root rationalisation (or rationalization) is a process by which radicals in the denominator of an algebraic fraction are eliminated.

If the denominator is a monomial in some radical, say $a{\sqrt[n]{x}}^k,$ with k < n, rationalisation consists of multiplying the numerator and the denominator by $\sqrt[n]{x}^{n - k}$, and replacing ${\sqrt[n]{x}}^n$ by x (this is allowed, as, by definition, a nth root of x is a number that has x as its nth power). If k ≥ n, one writes k = qn + r with 0 ≤ r < n (Euclidean division), and ${\sqrt[n]{x}}^k = x^q\sqrt[n]x^r;$ then one proceeds as above by multiplying by $\sqrt[n]{x}^{n - r}.$

If the denominator is linear in some square root, say $a+b\sqrt{x},$ rationalisation consists of multiplying the numerator and the denominator by the conjugate $a-b\sqrt{x},$ and expanding the product in the denominator.

This technique may be extended to any algebraic denominator, by multiplying the numerator and the denominator by all algebraic conjugates of the denominator, and expanding the new denominator into the norm of the old denominator. However, except in special cases, the resulting fractions may have huge numerators and denominators, and, therefore, the technique is generally used only in the above elementary cases.

== Rationalisation of a monomial square root and cube root ==
For the fundamental technique, the numerator and denominator must be multiplied by the same factor.

Example 1:

$$\frac{10}{\sqrt{5}}$$

To rationalise this kind of expression, bring in the factor $\sqrt{5}$:

$$\frac{10}{\sqrt{5}} = \frac{10}{\sqrt{5}} \cdot \frac{\sqrt{5}}{\sqrt{5}} = \frac{{10\sqrt{5}}}{\left(\sqrt{5}\right)^2}$$

The square root disappears from the denominator, because $\left(\sqrt 5\right)^2= 5$ by definition of a square root:

$$\frac{{10\sqrt{5}}}{\left(\sqrt{5}\right)^2} = \frac{10\sqrt{5}}{5} = 2\sqrt{5},$$

which is the result of the rationalisation.

Example 2:

$$\frac{10}{\sqrt[3]{a}}$$

To rationalise this radical, bring in the factor $\sqrt[3]{a}^2$:

$$\frac{10}{\sqrt[3]{a}} = \frac{10}{\sqrt[3]{a}} \cdot \frac{\sqrt[3]{a}^2}{\sqrt[3]{a}^2} = \frac{{10\sqrt[3]{a}^2}}{\sqrt[3]{a}^3}$$

The cube root disappears from the denominator, because it is cubed; so

$$\frac{{10\sqrt[3]{a}^2}}{\sqrt[3]{a}^3} = \frac{10\sqrt[3]{a}^2}{a},$$

which is the result of the rationalisation.

== Dealing with more square roots ==
For a denominator that is:

$$\sqrt{2}\pm \sqrt{3}\,$$

Rationalisation can be achieved by multiplying by the conjugate:

$$\sqrt{2} \mp \sqrt{3}\,$$

and applying the difference of two squares identity, which here will yield −1. To get this result, the entire fraction should be multiplied by

$$\frac{ \sqrt{2}-\sqrt{3} }{\sqrt{2}-\sqrt{3}} = 1.$$

This technique works much more generally. It can easily be adapted to remove one square root at a time, i.e. to rationalise

$$x \pm \sqrt{y}\,$$

by multiplication by

$$x \mp \sqrt{y}$$

Example:

$$\frac{3}{\sqrt{3}\pm \sqrt{5}}$$

The fraction must be multiplied by a quotient containing ${\sqrt{3}\mp \sqrt{5}}$.

$$\frac{3}{\sqrt{3}+\sqrt{5}} \cdot \frac{\sqrt{3}-\sqrt{5}}{\sqrt{3}-\sqrt{5}} = \frac{3(\sqrt{3}-\sqrt{5})}{\sqrt{3}^2 - \sqrt{5}^2}$$

Now, we can proceed to remove the square roots in the denominator:

$$\frac{{3(\sqrt{3}-\sqrt{5}) }}{\sqrt{3}^2 - \sqrt{5}^2} = \frac{ 3 (\sqrt{3} - \sqrt{5} ) }{ 3 - 5 } = \frac{ 3( \sqrt{3}-\sqrt{5} )  }{-2}$$

Example 2:

This process also works with complex numbers with $i=\sqrt{-1}$

$$\frac{7}{1\pm \sqrt{-5}}$$

The fraction must be multiplied by a quotient containing ${1\mp \sqrt{-5}}$.

$$\frac{7}{1+\sqrt{-5}} \cdot \frac{1-\sqrt{-5}}{1-\sqrt{-5}} = \frac{7(1-\sqrt{-5})}{1^2 - \sqrt{-5}^2} = \frac{ 7 (1 - \sqrt{-5} ) }{ 1 - (-5) } = \frac{ 7 -7\sqrt{5} i }{6}$$

== Generalizations ==
Rationalisation can be extended to all algebraic numbers and algebraic functions (as an application of norm forms). For example, to rationalise a cube root, two linear factors involving cube roots of unity should be used, or equivalently a quadratic factor.
