= Biased random walk on a graph =

Structural analysis of a network

In network science, a biased random walk on a graph is a time path process in which an evolving variable jumps from its current state to one of various potential new states; unlike in a pure random walk, the probabilities of the potential new states are unequal.

Biased random walks on a graph provide an approach for the structural analysis of undirected graphs in order to extract their symmetries when the network is too complex or when it is not large enough to be analyzed by statistical methods. The concept of biased random walks on a graph has attracted the attention of many researchers and data companies over the past decade especially in the transportation and social networks.

== Model ==
There have been written many different representations of the biased random walks on graphs based on the particular purpose of the analysis. A common representation of the mechanism for undirected graphs is as follows:

On an undirected graph, a walker takes a step from the current node, $j,$ to node $i.$ Assuming that each node has an attribute $\alpha_i,$ the probability of jumping from node $j$ to $i$ is given by:

$$T_{ij}^\alpha=\frac{\alpha_i A_{ij}}{\sum_{k} \alpha_k A_{kj}},$$

where $A_{ij}$ represents the topological weight of the edge going from $j$ to $i.$

In fact, the steps of the walker are biased by the factor of $\alpha$ which may differ from one node to another.

Depending on the network, the attribute $\alpha$ can be interpreted differently. It might be implied as the attraction of a person in a social network, it might be betweenness centrality or even it might be explained as an intrinsic characteristic of a node. In case of a fair random walk on graph $\alpha$ is one for all the nodes.

In case of shortest paths random walks $\alpha_i$ is the total number of the shortest paths between all pairs of nodes that pass through the node $i$. In fact the walker prefers the nodes with higher betweenness centrality which is defined as below:

$$C(i)=\tfrac{\text{Total number of shortest paths through } i}{\text{Total number of shortest paths}}$$

Based on the above equation, the recurrence time to a node in the biased walk is given by:

$$r_i=\frac{1}{C(i)}$$

== Applications ==
There are a variety of applications using biased random walks on graphs. Such applications include control of diffusion, advertisement of products on social networks, explaining dispersal and population redistribution of animals and micro-organisms, community detections, wireless networks, and search engines.

== See also ==
- Betweenness centrality
- Community structure
- Kullback–Leibler divergence
- Markov chain
- Maximal entropy random walk
- Random walk closeness centrality
- Social network analysis
- Travelling salesman problem
