= Decimalisation (disambiguation) =

Decimalisation or decimalization is the conversion of a measurement system to units of decimal (base ten) form, instead of traditional units of other forms, such as those formed by successive doubling or halving. For example, a series of (1000, 100, 10, 1, 0.1, 0.01, 0.001) instead of (16, 8, 4, 2, 1, 1/2, 1/4, 1/8, 1/16, 1/32, 1/64). Thus the word may refer to:

- Decimalisation of currencies
- Decimalisation of physical measurements (such as distance or weight), intimately bound historically with metrication
- Decimalisation of time units
  - Decimalisation of the time of day via decimal time systems
  - Decimalisation of the calendar via decimal calendar systems
