= Conjugate (square roots) =

Change of the sign of a square root

In mathematics, the conjugate of an expression of the form $a + b \sqrt d$ is $a - b \sqrt d,$ provided that $\sqrt d$ does not appear in a and b. One says also that the two expressions are conjugate.

In particular, the two solutions of a quadratic equation are conjugate, as per the $\pm$ in the quadratic formula $x = \frac{-b \pm \sqrt{b^2 - 4ac} }{2a}$.

Complex conjugation is the special case where the square root is $i = \sqrt{-1},$ the imaginary unit.

== Properties ==
As
$$(a + b \sqrt d)(a - b \sqrt d) = a^2 - b^2 d$$
and
$$(a + b \sqrt d) + (a - b \sqrt d) = 2a,$$
the sum and the product of conjugate expressions no longer involve the square root.

This property is used for removing a square root from a denominator, by multiplying the numerator and the denominator of a fraction by the conjugate of the denominator (see Rationalisation). An example of this usage is:
$$\frac{a + b \sqrt d}{x + y\sqrt d} = \frac{(a + b \sqrt d)(x - y \sqrt d)}{(x + y \sqrt d)(x - y \sqrt d)}
= \frac{ax - dby + (xb - ay) \sqrt d}{x^2 - y^2 d}.$$
Hence:
$$\frac{1}{a + b \sqrt d} = \frac{a - b \sqrt d}{a^2 - db^2}.$$

A corollary property is that the subtraction:

$$(a+b\sqrt d) - (a-b\sqrt d)= 2b\sqrt d,$$

leaves only a term containing the root.

== See also ==
- Conjugate element (field theory), the generalization to the roots of a polynomial of any degree
