= Non-integer base of numeration =

Number systems with a non-integer radix (base), such as base 2.5

A non-integer representation uses non-integer numbers as the radix, or base, of a positional numeral system. For a non-integer radix β > 1, the value of

$$x = d_n \dots d_2d_1d_0.d_{-1}d_{-2}\dots d_{-m}$$

is

$$\begin{align}
x &= \beta^nd_n + \cdots + \beta^2d_2 + \beta d_1 + d_0 \\
&\qquad + \beta^{-1}d_{-1} + \beta^{-2}d_{-2} + \cdots + \beta^{-m}d_{-m}.
\end{align}$$

The numbers d_{i} are non-negative integers less than β. This is also known as a β-expansion, a notion introduced by Rényi (1957) and first studied in detail by Parry (1960). Every real number has at least one (possibly infinite) β-expansion. The set of all β-expansions that have a finite representation is a subset of the ring Z[β, β^{−1}].

There are applications of β-expansions in coding theory and models of quasicrystals.

== Construction ==
β-expansions are a generalization of decimal expansions. While infinite decimal expansions are not unique (for example, 1.000... = 0.999...), all finite decimal expansions are unique. However, even finite β-expansions are not necessarily unique, for example φ + 1 = φ^{2} for β = φ, the golden ratio. A canonical choice for the β-expansion of a given real number can be determined by the following greedy algorithm, essentially due to Rényi (1957) and formulated as given here by Frougny (1992).

Let β > 1 be the base and x a non-negative real number. Denote by ⌊x⌋ the floor function of x (that is, the greatest integer less than or equal to x) and let {x} = x − ⌊x⌋ be the fractional part of x. There exists an integer k such that β^{k} ≤ x < β^{k+1}. Set

$$d_k = \lfloor x/\beta^k\rfloor$$

and

$$r_k = \{x/\beta^k\}.\,$$

For k − 1 ≥ j > −∞, put

$$d_j = \lfloor\beta r_{j+1}\rfloor, \quad r_j = \{\beta r_{j+1}\}.$$

In other words, the canonical β-expansion of x is defined by choosing the largest d_{k} such that β^{k}d_{k} ≤ x, then choosing the largest d_{k−1} such that β^{k}d_{k} + β^{k−1}d_{k−1} ≤ x, and so on. Thus it chooses the lexicographically largest string representing x.

With an integer base, this defines the usual radix expansion for the number x. This construction extends the usual algorithm to possibly non-integer values of β.

=== Conversion ===
Following the steps above, we can create a β-expansion for a real number $n \geq 0$ (the steps are identical for an $n < 0$, although n must first be multiplied by −1 to make it positive, then the result must be multiplied by −1 to make it negative again).

First, we must define our k value (the exponent of the nearest power of β greater than n, as well as the amount of digits in $\lfloor n_\beta \rfloor$, where $n_\beta$ is n written in base β). The k value for n and β can be written as:

$$k = \lfloor \log_\beta(n) \rfloor + 1$$

After a k value is found, $n_\beta$ can be written as d, where

$$d_j = \lfloor (n/\beta^j) \bmod \beta \rfloor, \quad n = n-d_j*\beta^j$$

for k − 1 ≥ j > −∞. The first k values of d appear to the left of the decimal place.

This can also be written in the following pseudocode:

function toBase(n, b) {
	k = floor(log(b, n)) + 1
	precision = 8
	result = ""

	for (i = k - 1, i > -precision-1, i--) {
		if (result.length == k) result += "."
		
		digit = floor((n / b^i) mod b)
		n -= digit * b^i
		result += digit
	}

	return result
}

Note that the above code is only valid for $1 < \beta \leq 10$ and $n \geq 0$, as it does not convert each digits to their correct symbols or correct negative numbers. For example, if a digit's value is 10, it will be represented as 10 instead of A.

=== Example implementation code ===
==== To base π ====
- JavaScript:
  function toBasePI(num, precision = 8) {    
    let k = Math.floor(Math.log(num)/Math.log(Math.PI)) + 1;
    if (k < 0) k = 0;

    let digits = [];

    for (let i = k-1; i > (-1*precision)-1; i--) {
        let digit = Math.floor((num / Math.pow(Math.PI, i)) % Math.PI);
        num -= digit * Math.pow(Math.PI, i);
        digits.push(digit);

        if (num < 0.1**(precision+1) && i <= 0)
            break;
    }

    if (digits.length > k)
        digits.splice(k, 0, ".");

    return digits.join("");
}

==== From base π ====
- JavaScript:
  function fromBasePI(num) {
    let numberSplit = num.split(/\./g);
    let numberLength = numberSplit[0].length;

    let output = 0;
    let digits = numberSplit.join("");

    for (let i = 0; i < digits.length; i++) {
        output += digits[i] * Math.pow(Math.PI, numberLength-i-1);
    }

    return output;
}

== Examples ==
=== Base √2 ===
Base √2 behaves in a very similar way to base 2 as all one has to do to convert a number from binary into base √2 is put a zero digit in between every binary digit; for example, 1911_{10} = 11101110111_{2} becomes 101010001010100010101_{√2} and 5118_{10} = 1001111111110_{2} becomes 1000001010101010101010100_{√2}. This means that every integer can be expressed in base √2 without the need of a radix point. The base can also be used to show the relationship between the side of a square to its diagonal as a square with a side length of 1_{√2} will have a diagonal of 10_{√2} and a square with a side length of 10_{√2} will have a diagonal of 100_{√2}. Another use of the base is to show the silver ratio as its representation in base √2 is simply 11_{√2}. In addition, the area of a regular octagon with side length 1_{√2} is 1100_{√2}, the area of a regular octagon with side length 10_{√2} is 110000_{√2}, the area of a regular octagon with side length 100_{√2} is 11000000_{√2}, etc...

=== Golden base ===
In the golden base, some numbers have more than one decimal base equivalent: they are ambiguous. For example, 11_{φ} = 100_{φ}, since φ² = φ + 1.

=== Base ψ ===
There are some numbers in base ψ, the supergolden ratio, that are also ambiguous. For example, 101_{ψ} = 1000_{ψ}, since ψ³ = ψ² + 1.

=== Base e ===
With base e the natural logarithm behaves like the common logarithm in base 10, as ln(1_{e}) = 0, ln(10_{e}) = 1, ln(100_{e}) = 2 and ln(1000_{e}) = 3 (or more precisely the representation in base e of 3, which is a non-terminating number). This means that the integer part of the natural logarithm of a number in base e counts the number of digits before the separating point in that number, minus one.

The base e is the most economical choice of radix β > 1, where the radix economy is measured as the product of the radix and the length of the string of symbols needed to express a given range of values. A binary number uses only two different digits, but it needs a lot of digits for representing a number; base 10 writes shorter numbers, but it needs 10 different digits to write them. The balance between those is base e, which therefore would store numbers optimally.

=== Base π ===
Base π can be used to more easily show the relationship between the diameter of a circle to its circumference, which corresponds to its perimeter; since circumference = diameter × π, a circle with a diameter 1_{π} will have a circumference of 10_{π}, a circle with a diameter 10_{π} will have a circumference of 100_{π}, etc. Furthermore, since the area = π × radius^{2}, a circle with a radius of 1_{π} will have an area of 10_{π}, a circle with a radius of 10_{π} will have an area of 1000_{π} and a circle with a radius of 100_{π} will have an area of 100000_{π}.

== Properties ==
In every positional number system, not all numbers are expressed uniquely. For example, in base 10, the number 1 has two representations: 1.000... and 0.999.... The set of numbers with two different representations is dense in the reals, but the question of classifying real numbers with unique β-expansions is considerably more subtle than that of integer bases.

Another problem is to classify the real numbers whose β-expansions are periodic. Let β > 1, and Q(β) be the smallest field extension of the rationals containing β. Then any real number in [0,1) having a periodic β-expansion must lie in Q(β). On the other hand, the converse need not be true. The converse does hold if β is a Pisot number, although necessary and sufficient conditions are not known.

== See also ==
- Beta encoder
- Non-standard positional numeral systems
- Decimal expansion
- Power series
- Ostrowski numeration
