= Euler's constant =

Difference between logarithm and harmonic series

- Rationality: Unknown
- Symbol: γ

Representations
- Decimal: 0.57721...
- Continued fraction: $\gamma=0+\cfrac{1}{1+\cfrac{1}{1+\cfrac{1}{2+\cfrac{1}{1+\cfrac{1}{2+\cfrac{1}{1+\cfrac{1}{4+\dots}}}}}}}$

The area of the blue region converges to Euler's constant.

Euler's constant (sometimes called the Euler–Mascheroni constant) is a mathematical constant, usually denoted by the lowercase Greek letter gamma (γ), defined as the limiting difference between the harmonic series and the natural logarithm, denoted here by log:

$$\begin{align}
\gamma &= \lim_{n\to\infty}\left(\sum_{k=1}^n \frac1{k}-\log n \right)\\
&=\int_1^\infty\left(\frac1{\lfloor x\rfloor}-\frac1x\right)\,\mathrm dx.
\end{align}$$

Here, ⌊·⌋ represents the floor function.

The numerical value of Euler's constant, to 50 decimal places, is:

0.57721 56649 01532 86060 65120 90082 40243 10421 59335 93992 ...

== Introduction ==
The usual definition of Euler's constant is, as stated above, given via the limiting difference between the harmonic series and the natural logarithm. The divergence of the former series was already known centuries prior, and Euler, who sought to find a continuous interpolation of the discrete harmonic series, found its growth rate to be asymptotically equivalent to that of the natural logarithm. In particular, he proved that:

$$\gamma = \lim_{n \to \infty}\left(\frac{1}{1}+\frac{1}{2}+\frac{1}{3} + \ldots + \frac{1}{n} - \log(n)\right)$$

exists. This can be seen by setting $a_n=H_n-\log n$ as the partial terms of the limit (H_{n} are the harmonic numbers) and noting that this sequence is monotonically decreasing:

$$a_{n+1}-a_{n} = \frac{1}{n+1} - \log\left(1+\frac1n\right) < 0$$

as well as bounded from below:

$$a_{n} = \sum_{k=1}^n \frac1k - \int_1^n \frac1t \,dt > 0.$$

and hence convergent to a constant $0\leq \gamma <1=a_1$.

Euler showed that the following infinite series approaches γ:

$$\gamma = \sum_{k=1}^\infty \left(\frac 1 k - \log\left(1+\frac 1 k \right)\right).$$

This can be seen by noting that its partial sums form a telescoping series, such that the series again yields a limit between the harmonic series and a shifted natural logarithm.

In general:

$$\gamma = \lim_{n \to \infty}\left(\frac{1}{1}+\frac{1}{2}+\frac{1}{3} + \ldots + \frac{1}{n} - \log(n+\alpha) \right) \equiv \lim_{n \to \infty} \gamma_n(\alpha)$$

for any α > −n. However, the rate of convergence of this expansion depends significantly on α. In particular, γ_{n}(1/2) exhibits much more rapid convergence than the conventional expansion γ_{n}(0). This is because

$$\frac{1}{2(n+1)} < \gamma_n(0) - \gamma < \frac{1}{2n},$$

while

$$\frac{1}{24(n+1)^2} < \gamma_n(1/2) - \gamma < \frac{1}{24n^2}.$$

This can also be seen in the following asymptotic formulas:

- $\gamma \sim H_n - \log n - \frac1{2n} + \frac1{12n^2} - \frac1{120n^4} + \cdots$ (Euler)
- $\gamma \sim H_n - \log\left({n + \frac1{2} + \frac1{24n} - \frac1{48n^2} + \cdots}\right)$ (Negoi)
- $\gamma \sim H_n - \frac{\log n + \log(n+1)}{2} - \frac1{6n(n+1)} + \frac1{30n^2(n+1)^2} - \cdots$ (Cesàro)

The third formula is also called the Ramanujan expansion.

Even so, there exist other series expansions which converge more rapidly than this; some of these are discussed below.

== History ==
The constant first appeared in a 1734 paper by the Swiss mathematician Leonhard Euler, titled De Progressionibus harmonicis observationes (Observations on harmonic progressions; Eneström Index 43), where he described it as "worthy of serious consideration". Euler initially calculated the constant's value to 6 decimal places. In 1781, he calculated it to 16 decimal places. Euler used the notations C and O for the constant. The Italian mathematician Lorenzo Mascheroni attempted to calculate the constant to 32 decimal places, but made errors in the 20th–22nd and 31st–32nd decimal places; starting from the 20th digit, he calculated ...1811209008239 when the correct value is ...0651209008240. In 1790, he used the notations A and a for the constant. Other computations were done by Johann von Soldner in 1809, who used the notation H. The notation γ appears nowhere in the writings of either Euler or Mascheroni, and was chosen at a later time, perhaps because of the constant's connection to the gamma function. For example, the German mathematician Carl Anton Bretschneider used the notation γ in 1835, and Augustus De Morgan used it in a textbook published in parts from 1836 to 1842. Other notations were also occasionally used. Euler's constant was also studied by the Indian mathematician Srinivasa Ramanujan who published one paper on it in 1917. David Hilbert mentioned the irrationality of γ as an unsolved problem that seems "unapproachable" and, allegedly, the English mathematician Godfrey Hardy offered to give up his Savilian Chair at Oxford to anyone who could prove this.

== Appearances ==
Euler's constant appears frequently in mathematics, especially in number theory and analysis. Examples include, among others, the following places: (where '*' means that this entry contains an explicit equation):

=== Analysis ===
- The Weierstrass product formula for the gamma function and the Barnes G-function.
- The asymptotic expansion of the gamma function, $\Gamma(1/x)\sim x-\gamma$.
- Evaluations of the digamma function at rational values.
- The Laurent series expansion for the Riemann zeta function*, where it is the first of the Stieltjes constants.
- Values of the derivative of the Riemann zeta function and Dirichlet beta function.
- In connection to the Laplace and Mellin transform.
- In the regularization/renormalization of the harmonic series as a finite value.
- Expressions involving the exponential and logarithmic integral.*
- A definition of the cosine integral.*
- In relation to Bessel functions.
- Asymptotic expansions of modified Struve functions.
- In relation to other special functions.

=== Number theory ===
- An inequality for Euler's totient function.
- The growth rate of the divisor function.
- A formulation of the Riemann hypothesis.
- The third of Mertens' theorems.*
- The calculation of the Meissel–Mertens constant.
- Lower bounds to specific prime gaps.
- An approximation of the average number of divisors of all numbers from 1 to a given n.
- The Lenstra–Pomerance–Wagstaff conjecture on the frequency of Mersenne primes.
- An estimation of the efficiency of the euclidean algorithm.
- Sums involving the Möbius and von Mangolt function.
- Estimate of the divisor summatory function of the Dirichlet hyperbola method.

=== In other fields ===
- In some formulations of Zipf's law.
- The answer to the coupon collector's problem.*
- The mean of the Gumbel distribution.
- An approximation of the Landau distribution.
- The information entropy of the Weibull and Lévy distributions, and, implicitly, of the chi-squared distribution for one or two degrees of freedom.
- An upper bound on Shannon entropy in quantum information theory.
- In dimensional regularization of Feynman diagrams in quantum field theory.
- In the BCS equation on the critical temperature in BCS theory of superconductivity.*
- Fisher–Orr model for genetics of adaptation in evolutionary biology.

== Properties ==
=== Irrationality and transcendence ===
The number γ has not been proved algebraic or transcendental. In fact, it is not even known whether γ is irrational. The ubiquity of γ revealed by the large number of equations below and the fact that γ has been called the third most important mathematical constant after π and e makes the irrationality of γ a major open question in mathematics.

Unsolved problem in mathematics
Is Euler's constant irrational? If so, is it transcendental?
More unsolved problems in mathematics

However, some progress has been made. In 1959 Andrei Shidlovsky proved that at least one of Euler's constant γ and the Gompertz constant δ is irrational; Tanguy Rivoal proved in 2012 that at least one of them is transcendental. Kurt Mahler showed in 1968 that the number $\frac \pi 2\frac{Y_0(2)}{J_0(2)}-\gamma$ is transcendental, where $J_0$ and $Y_0$ are the usual Bessel functions. It is known that the transcendence degree of the field $\mathbb Q(e,\gamma,\delta)$ is at least two.

In 2010, M. Ram Murty and N. Saradha showed that at most one of the Euler-Lehmer constants, i. e. the numbers of the form
$$\gamma(a,q) = \lim_{n\rightarrow\infty}\left(\sum_{k=0}^n{\frac{1}{a+kq}} - \frac{\log{(a+nq})}{q} \right)$$
is algebraic, if q ≥ 2 and 1 ≤ a < q; this family includes the special case γ(2,4) = γ/4.

Using the same approach, in 2013, M. Ram Murty and A. Zaytseva showed that the generalized Euler constants have the same property, where the generalized Euler constant are defined as
$$\gamma(\Omega) = \lim_{x\rightarrow\infty} \left( \sum_{n=1}^x \frac{1_\Omega(n)}{n} - \log x \cdot \lim_{x\rightarrow\infty} \frac{ \sum_{n=1}^x 1_\Omega (n) }{x} \right),$$
where $\Omega$ is a fixed list of prime numbers, $1_\Omega(n) =0$ if at least one of the primes in $\Omega$ is a prime factor of $n$, and $1_\Omega(n) =1$ otherwise. In particular, $\gamma(\empty)=\gamma$.

Using a continued fraction analysis, Papanikolaou showed in 1997 that if γ is rational, its denominator must be greater than 10^{244663}. If e^{γ} is a rational number, then its denominator must be greater than 10^{15000}.

Euler's constant is conjectured not to be an algebraic period, but the values of its first 10^{9} decimal digits seem to indicate that it could be a normal number.

=== Continued fraction ===
The simple continued fraction expansion of Euler's constant is given by:

$$\gamma=0+\cfrac{1}{1+\cfrac{1}{1+\cfrac{1}{2+\cfrac{1}{1+\cfrac{1}{2+\cfrac{1}{1+\cfrac{1}{4+\dots}}}}}}}$$

which has no apparent pattern. It is known to have at least 16,695,000,000 terms, and it has infinitely many terms if and only if γ is irrational.

The Khinchin limits for $\pi$ (red), $\gamma$ (blue) and $\sqrt[3]{2}$ (green).

Numerical evidence suggests that both Euler's constant γ as well as the constant e^{γ} are among the numbers for which the geometric mean of their simple continued fraction terms converges to Khinchin's constant. Similarly, when $p_n/q_n$ are the convergents of their respective continued fractions, the limit $\lim_{n\to\infty}q_n^{1/n}$ appears to converge to Lévy's constant in both cases. However neither of these limits has been proven.

There also exists a generalized continued fraction for Euler's constant.

A good simple approximation of γ is given by the reciprocal of the square root of 3 or about 0.57735:

$$\frac1\sqrt {3}=0+\cfrac{1}{1+\cfrac{1}{1+\cfrac{1}{2+\cfrac{1}{1+\cfrac{1}{2+\cfrac{1}{1+\cfrac{1}{2+\dots}}}}}}}$$

with the difference being about 1 in 7,429.

== Formulas and identities ==
=== Relation to gamma function ===
γ is related to the digamma function Ψ and hence to the derivative of the gamma function Γ, when both functions are evaluated at 1. Specifically:

$$-\gamma = \Gamma'(1) = \psi(1).$$

This is equal to the limits:

$$\begin{align}-\gamma &= \lim_{z\to 0}\left(\Gamma(z) - \frac1{z}\right) \\&= \lim_{z\to 0}\left(\psi(z) + \frac1{z}\right).\end{align}$$

Further limit results are:

$$\begin{align} \lim_{z\to 0}\frac1{z}\left(\frac1{\Gamma(1+z)} - \frac1{\Gamma(1-z)}\right) &= 2\gamma \\
\lim_{z\to 0}\frac1{z}\left(\frac1{\psi(1-z)} - \frac1{\psi(1+z)}\right) &= \frac{\pi^2}{3\gamma^2}. \end{align}$$

A limit related to the beta function (expressed in terms of gamma functions) is

$$\begin{align} \gamma &= \lim_{n\to\infty}\left(\frac{ \Gamma\left(\frac1{n}\right) \Gamma(n+1)\, n^{1+\frac1{n}}}{\Gamma\left(2+n+\frac1{n}\right)} - \frac{n^2}{n+1}\right) \\
&= \lim\limits_{m\to\infty}\sum_{k=1}^m{m \choose k}\frac{(-1)^k}{k}\log\big(\Gamma(k+1)\big). \end{align}$$

=== Relation to the zeta function ===
γ can also be expressed as an infinite sum whose terms involve the Riemann zeta function evaluated at positive integers:

$$\begin{align}\gamma &= \sum_{m=2}^{\infty} (-1)^m\frac{\zeta(m)}{m} \\
&= \log\frac4{\pi} + \sum_{m=2}^{\infty} (-1)^m\frac{\zeta(m)}{2^{m-1}m}.\end{align}$$
The constant $\gamma$ can also be expressed in terms of the sum of the reciprocals of non-trivial zeros $\rho$ of the zeta function:

$$\gamma = \log 4\pi + \sum_{\rho} \frac{2}{\rho} - 2$$

Other series related to the zeta function include:

$$\begin{align} \gamma &= \tfrac3{2}- \log 2 - \sum_{m=2}^\infty (-1)^m\,\frac{m-1}{m}\big(\zeta(m)-1\big) \\
&= \lim_{n\to\infty}\left(\frac{2n-1}{2n} - \log n + \sum_{k=2}^n \left(\frac1{k} - \frac{\zeta(1-k)}{n^k}\right)\right) \\
&= \lim_{n\to\infty}\left(\frac{2^n}{e^{2^n}} \sum_{m=0}^\infty \frac{2^{mn}}{(m+1)!} \sum_{t=0}^m \frac1{t+1} - n \log 2+ O \left (\frac1{2^{n}\, e^{2^n}}\right)\right).\end{align}$$

The error term in the last equation is a rapidly decreasing function of n. As a result, the formula is well-suited for efficient computation of the constant to high precision.

Other interesting limits equaling Euler's constant are the antisymmetric limit:

$$\begin{align} \gamma &= \lim_{s\to 1^+}\sum_{n=1}^\infty \left(\frac1{n^s}-\frac1{s^n}\right) \\&= \lim_{s\to 1}\left(\zeta(s) - \frac{1}{s-1}\right) \\&= \lim_{s\to 0}\frac{\zeta(1+s)+\zeta(1-s)}{2} \end{align}$$

and the following formula, established in 1898 by de la Vallée-Poussin:

$$\gamma = \lim_{n\to\infty}\frac1{n}\, \sum_{k=1}^n \left(\left\lceil \frac{n}{k} \right\rceil - \frac{n}{k}\right)$$

where ⌈ ⌉ are ceiling brackets. This formula indicates that when taking any positive integer n and dividing it by each positive integer k less than n, the average fraction by which the quotient n/k falls short of the next integer tends to γ (rather than 0.5) as n tends to infinity.

Closely related to this is the rational zeta series expression. By taking separately the first few terms of the series above, one obtains an estimate for the classical series limit:

$$\gamma =\lim_{n\to\infty}\left( \sum_{k=1}^n \frac1{k} - \log n -\sum_{m=2}^\infty \frac{\zeta(m,n+1)}{m}\right),$$

where ζ(s, k) is the Hurwitz zeta function. The sum in this equation involves the harmonic numbers, H_{n}. Expanding some of the terms in the Hurwitz zeta function gives:

$$H_n = \log(n) + \gamma + \frac1{2n} - \frac1{12n^2} + \frac1{120n^4} - \varepsilon,$$
where 0 < ε < 1/252n^{6}.

γ can also be expressed as follows where A is the Glaisher–Kinkelin constant:

$$\gamma =12\,\log(A)-\log(2\pi)+\frac{6}{\pi^2}\,\zeta'(2)$$

γ can also be expressed as follows, which can be proven by expressing the zeta function as a Laurent series:

$$\gamma=\lim_{n\to\infty}\left(-n+\zeta\left(\frac{n+1}{n}\right)\right)$$

=== Relation to triangular numbers ===
Numerous formulations have been derived that express $\gamma$ in terms of sums and logarithms of triangular numbers. One of the earliest of these is a formula for the $n$th harmonic number attributed to Srinivasa Ramanujan where $\gamma$ is related to $\textstyle \log 2T_{k}$ in a series that considers the powers of $\textstyle \frac{1}{T_{k}}$ (an earlier, less-generalizable proof by Ernesto Cesàro gives the first two terms of the series, with an error term):

$$\begin{align}
\gamma
&= H_u - \frac{1}{2} \log 2T_u - \sum_{k=1}^{v}\frac{R(k)}{T_{u}^{k}}-\Theta_{v}\,\frac{R(v+1)}{T_{u}^{v+1}}
\end{align}$$

From Stirling's approximation follows a similar series:

$$\gamma = \log 2\pi - \sum_{k=2}^{\infty} \frac{\zeta(k)}{T_{k}}$$

The series of inverse triangular numbers also features in the study of the Basel problem posed by Pietro Mengoli. Mengoli proved that $\textstyle \sum_{k = 1}^\infty \frac{1}{2T_k} = 1$, a result Jacob Bernoulli later used to estimate the value of $\zeta(2)$, placing it between $1$ and $\textstyle \sum_{k = 1}^\infty \frac{2}{2T_k} = \sum_{k = 1}^\infty \frac{1}{T_{k}} = 2$. This identity appears in a formula used by Bernhard Riemann to compute roots of the zeta function, where $\gamma$ is expressed in terms of the sum of roots $\rho$ plus the difference between Boya's expansion and the series of exact unit fractions $\textstyle \sum_{k = 1}^{\infty} \frac{1}{T_{k}}$:

$$\gamma - \log 2 = \log 2\pi + \sum_{\rho} \frac{2}{\rho} - \sum_{k = 1}^{\infty} \frac{1}{T_k}$$

=== Integrals ===
γ equals the value of a number of definite integrals:

$$\begin{align}
\gamma &= - \int_0^\infty e^{-x} \log x \,dx \\
&= -\int_0^1\log\left(\log\frac 1 x \right) dx \\
&= \int_0^\infty \left(\frac1{e^x-1}-\frac1{x\cdot e^x} \right)dx \\
&= \int_0^1\frac{1-e^{-x}}{x} \, dx -\int_1^\infty \frac{e^{-x}}{x}\, dx\\
&= \int_0^1\left(\frac1{\log x} + \frac1{1-x}\right)dx\\
&= \int_0^\infty \left(\frac1{1+x^k}-e^{-x}\right)\frac{dx}{x},\quad k>0\\
&= 2\int_0^\infty \frac{e^{-x^2}-e^{-x}}{x} \, dx ,\\
&= \frac{1}{2}+\int_{0}^{\infty}\log\left(1+\frac{\log\left(1+\frac{1}{t}\right)^{2}}{4\pi^{2}}\right)dt \\
&= \frac{1}{2}+\int_{0}^{\infty}\frac{2x\,dx}{(x^2+1)(e^{2\pi x}-1)} \\
&= \frac{1}{\pi}\int_{0}^{\pi}\frac{\sin x}{x}e^{x\cot x}\log\left(\frac{\sin x}{x}e^{x\cot x}\right)dx \\
&= \int_0^1 H_x \, dx, \\
&= 1-\int_0^1 \{1/x\} dx
\end{align}$$
where H_{x} is the fractional harmonic number, and $\{1/x\}$ is the fractional part of $1/x$.

Definite integrals in which γ appears include:

$$\begin{align}
\int_0^\infty e^{-x^2} \log x \,dx &= -\frac{(\gamma+2\log 2)\sqrt{\pi}}{4} \\
\int_0^\infty e^{-x} \log^2 x \,dx &= \gamma^2 + \frac{\pi^2}{6}
\\ \int_0^\infty \frac{e^{-x}\log x}{e^x +1} \,dx &= \frac12 \log^2 2 - \gamma \\
\int_0^\infty \frac{\log x}{\cosh^2x} \, dx &= \log\frac{\pi}{4}-\gamma
\end{align}$$

We also have Catalan's 1875 integral

$$\gamma = \int_0^1 \left(\frac1{1+x}\sum_{n=1}^\infty x^{2^n-1}\right)\,dx.$$

One can express γ using a special case of Hadjicostas's formula as a double integral with equivalent series:

$$\begin{align}
\gamma &= \int_0^1 \int_0^1 \frac{x-1}{(1-xy)\log xy}\,dx\,dy \\
&= \sum_{n=1}^\infty \left(\frac 1 n -\log\frac{n+1} n \right).
\end{align}$$

An interesting comparison by Sondow is the double integral and alternating series

$$\begin{align}
\log\frac 4 \pi &= \int_0^1 \int_0^1 \frac{x-1}{(1+xy)\log xy} \,dx\,dy \\
&= \sum_{n=1}^\infty \left((-1)^{n-1}\left(\frac 1 n -\log\frac{n+1} n \right)\right).
\end{align}$$

It shows that log 4/π may be thought of as an "alternating Euler constant".

=== Series expansions ===
The two constants are also related by the pair of series

$$\begin{align}
\gamma &= \sum_{n=1}^\infty \frac{N_1(n) + N_0(n)}{2n(2n+1)} \\
\log\frac4{\pi} &= \sum_{n=1}^\infty \frac{N_1(n) - N_0(n)}{2n(2n+1)} ,
\end{align}$$

where N_{1}(n) and N_{0}(n) are the number of 1s and 0s, respectively, in the base 2 expansion of n.

This series for γ is equivalent to a series Nielsen found in 1897:

$$\gamma = 1 - \sum_{k=2}^\infty (-1)^k\frac{\left\lfloor\log_2 k\right\rfloor}{k+1}.$$

In 1910, Vacca found the closely related series

$$\begin{align}
\gamma & = \sum_{k=1}^\infty (-1)^k\frac{\left\lfloor\log_2 k\right\rfloor} k \\[5pt]
& = \tfrac12-\tfrac13 + 2\left(\tfrac14 - \tfrac15 + \tfrac16 - \tfrac17\right) + 3\left(\tfrac18 - \tfrac19 + \tfrac1{10} - \tfrac1{11} + \cdots - \tfrac1{15}\right) + \cdots,
\end{align}$$

where log_{2} is the logarithm to base 2 and ⌊ ⌋ is the floor function.

This can be generalized to:

$$\gamma= \sum_{k=1}^\infty \frac{\left\lfloor\log_B k\right\rfloor}{k} \varepsilon(k)$$
where:
$$\varepsilon(k)= \begin{cases} B-1, &\text{if } B\mid n \\ -1, &\text{if }B\nmid n \end{cases}$$

In 1926 Vacca found a second series:

$$\begin{align}
\gamma + \zeta(2) & = \sum_{k=2}^\infty \left( \frac1{\left\lfloor\sqrt{k}\right\rfloor^2} - \frac1{k}\right) \\[5pt]
& = \sum_{k=2}^\infty \frac{k - \left\lfloor\sqrt{k}\right\rfloor^2}{k \left\lfloor \sqrt{k} \right\rfloor^2} \\[5pt]
&= \frac12 + \frac23 + \frac1{2^2}\sum_{k=1}^{2\cdot 2} \frac{k}{k+2^2} + \frac1{3^2}\sum_{k=1}^{3\cdot 2} \frac{k}{k+3^2} + \cdots
\end{align}$$

From the Malmsten–Kummer expansion for the logarithm of the gamma function we get:

$$\gamma = \log\pi - 4\log\left(\Gamma(\tfrac34)\right) + \frac 4 \pi \sum_{k=1}^\infty (-1)^{k+1}\frac{\log(2k+1)}{2k+1}.$$

Ramanujan, in his lost notebook gave a series that approaches γ:

$$\gamma = \log 2 - \sum_{n=1}^{\infty} \sum_{k=\frac{3^{n-1}+1}{2}}^{\frac{3^{n}-1}{2}} \frac{2n}{(3k)^3-3k}$$

An important expansion for Euler's constant is due to Fontana and Mascheroni

$$\gamma = \sum_{n=1}^\infty \frac{|G_n|}{n} = \frac12 + \frac1{24} + \frac1{72} + \frac{19}{2880} + \frac3{800} + \cdots,$$
where G_{n} are Gregory coefficients. This series is the special case k = 1 of the expansions

$$\begin{align}
\gamma &= H_{k-1}  - \log k + \sum_{n=1}^{\infty}\frac{(n-1)!|G_n|}{k(k+1) \cdots (k+n-1)} && \\
&= H_{k-1} - \log k + \frac1{2k} + \frac1{12k(k+1)} + \frac1{12k(k+1)(k+2)} + \frac{19}{120k(k+1)(k+2)(k+3)} + \cdots &&
\end{align}$$

convergent for k = 1, 2, ...

A similar series with the Cauchy numbers of the second kind C_{n} is

$$\gamma = 1 -  \sum_{n=1}^\infty \frac{C_{n}}{n \, (n+1)!} =1- \frac{1}{4} -\frac{5}{72} - \frac{1}{32} - \frac{251}{14400} - \frac{19}{1728} - \ldots$$

Blagouchine (2018) found a generalisation of the Fontana–Mascheroni series

$$\gamma=\sum_{n=1}^\infty\frac{(-1)^{n+1}}{2n}\Big\{\psi_{n}(a)+ \psi_{n}\Big(-\frac{a}{1+a}\Big)\Big\},
\quad a>-1$$

where ψ_{n}(a) are the Bernoulli polynomials of the second kind, which are defined by the generating function

$$\frac{z(1+z)^s}{\log(1+z)}= \sum_{n=0}^\infty z^n \psi_n(s) ,\qquad |z|<1.$$

For any rational a this series contains rational terms only. For example, at a = 1, it becomes

$$\gamma=\frac{3}{4} - \frac{11}{96} - \frac{1}{72} - \frac{311}{46080} - \frac{5}{1152} - \frac{7291}{2322432}  - \frac{243}{100352} - \ldots$$
Other series with the same polynomials include these examples:

$$\gamma= -\log(a+1) - \sum_{n=1}^\infty\frac{(-1)^n \psi_{n}(a)}{n},\qquad \Re(a)>-1$$

and

$$\gamma= -\frac{2}{1+2a} \left\{\log\Gamma(a+1) -\frac{1}{2}\log(2\pi) + \frac{1}{2} + \sum_{n=1}^\infty\frac{(-1)^n \psi_{n+1}(a)}{n}\right\},\qquad \Re(a)>-1$$

where Γ(a) is the gamma function.

A series related to the Akiyama–Tanigawa algorithm is

$$\gamma= \log(2\pi) - 2 - 2 \sum_{n=1}^\infty\frac{(-1)^n G_{n}(2)}{n}=
\log(2\pi) - 2 + \frac{2}{3} + \frac{1}{24}+ \frac{7}{540} + \frac{17}{2880}+ \frac{41}{12600} + \ldots$$

where G_{n}(2) are the Gregory coefficients of the second order.

As a series of prime numbers:

$$\gamma = \lim_{n\to\infty}\left(\log n - \sum_{p\le n}\frac{\log p}{p-1}\right).$$

Alabdulmohsin derived closed-form expressions for the sums of errors of approximations for the harmonic numbers:

$$\begin{align}
\sum_{n=1}^\infty \Big(\log n +\gamma + \frac{1}{2n} -H_n\Big) &= \frac{\log (2\pi)-1-\gamma}{2} \\
\sum_{n=1}^\infty \Big(\log \sqrt{n(n+1)} +\gamma - H_n \Big) &= \frac{\log (2\pi)-1}{2}-\gamma \\
\sum_{n=1}^\infty (-1)^n\Big(\log n +\gamma - H_n\Big) &= \frac{\log \pi-\gamma}{2}
\end{align}$$

=== Exponential ===
The constant e^{γ} is important in number theory. Its numerical value is:

1.78107241799019798523650410310717954916964521430343....

e^{γ} equals the following limit, where p_{n} is the nth prime number:

$$e^\gamma = \lim_{n\to\infty}\frac1{\log p_n} \prod_{i=1}^n \frac{p_i}{p_i-1}.$$

This restates the third of Mertens' theorems.

We further have the following product involving the three constants e, π and γ:

$$\frac{\pi^2}{6e^\gamma}=\lim_{n\to\infty} \log p_n \prod_{i=1}^n \frac{p_i}{p_i+1}.$$

The exponential also appears in the Weierstrass product formula for the reciprocal of the gamma function:

$$\frac1{\Gamma(z)}=ze^{\gamma z}\prod_{n=1}^\infty\left(e^{-\frac{z}{n}}\left(1+\frac{z}{n}\right)\right).$$

It also holds that

$$\frac{e^\frac{\pi}{2}+e^{-\frac{\pi}{2}}}{\pi e^\gamma}=\prod_{n=1}^\infty\left(e^{-\frac{1}{n}}\left(1+\frac{1}{n}+\frac{1}{2n^2}\right)\right).$$

Other infinite products relating to e^{γ} include:

$$\begin{align}
\frac{e^{1+\frac{\gamma}{2}}}{\sqrt{2\pi}} &= \prod_{n=1}^\infty e^{-1+\frac1{2n}}\left(1+\frac1{n}\right)^n \\
\frac{e^{3+2\gamma}}{2\pi} &= \prod_{n=1}^\infty e^{-2+\frac2{n}}\left(1+\frac2{n}\right)^n. \end{align}$$

These products result from the Barnes G-function.

In addition,

$$e^{\gamma} = \sqrt{\frac2{1}} \cdot \sqrt[3]{\frac{2^2}{1\cdot 3}} \cdot \sqrt[4]{\frac{2^3\cdot 4}{1\cdot 3^3}} \cdot \sqrt[5]{\frac{2^4\cdot 4^4}{1\cdot 3^6\cdot 5}} \cdots$$

where the nth factor is the (n + 1)th root of

$$\prod_{k=0}^n (k+1)^{(-1)^{k+1}{n \choose k}}.$$

This infinite product, first discovered by Ser in 1926, was rediscovered by Sondow using hypergeometric functions.

== Known digits ==
Euler's constant has been among the mathematical constants that have been calculated to the highest precision, with the record standing at over 1 trillion as of 2026.

Published decimal expansions of γ
Date	Decimal digits	Author	Sources
1734	5	Leonhard Euler	
1735	15	Leonhard Euler	
1781	16	Leonhard Euler	
1790	32	Lorenzo Mascheroni, with 20–22 and 31–32 wrong	
1809	22	Johann G. von Soldner	
1811	22	Carl Friedrich Gauss	
1812	40	Friedrich Bernhard Gottfried Nicolai	
1861	41	Ludwig Oettinger	
1867	49	William Shanks	
1871	100	James W.L. Glaisher	
1877	263	J. C. Adams	
1952	328	John William Wrench Jr.	
1961	1050	Helmut Fischer and Karl Zeller	
1962	1271	Donald Knuth	
1963	3566	Dura W. Sweeney	
1973	4879	William A. Beyer and Michael S. Waterman	
1977	20700	Richard P. Brent	
1980	30100	Richard P. Brent & Edwin M. McMillan	
1993	172000	Jonathan Borwein	
1997	1000000	Thomas Papanikolaou	
1998	7286255	Xavier Gourdon	
1999	108000000	Patrick Demichel and Xavier Gourdon	
March 13, 2009	29844489545	Alexander J. Yee & Raymond Chan	
December 22, 2013	119377958182	Alexander J. Yee	
March 15, 2016	160000000000	Peter Trueb	
May 18, 2016	250000000000	Ron Watkins	
August 23, 2017	477511832674	Ron Watkins	
May 26, 2020	600000000100	Seungmin Kim & Ian Cutress	
May 13, 2023	700000000000	Jordan Ranous & Kevin O'Brien	
September 7, 2023	1337000000000	Andrew Sun	

== Generalizations ==
=== Stieltjes constants ===
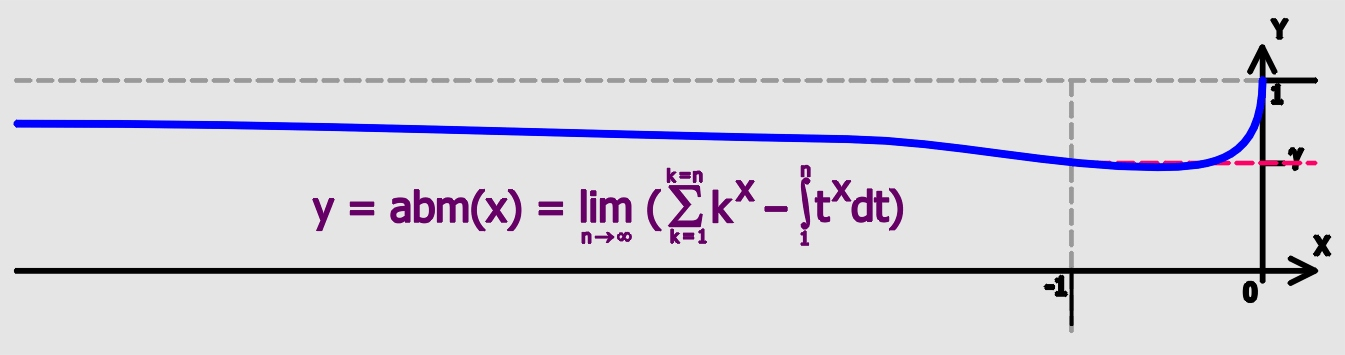
Euler's generalized constants abm$(-\alpha)$ for $\alpha>0$.

Euler's generalized constants are given by

$$\gamma_\alpha = \lim_{n\to\infty}\left(\sum_{k=1}^n \frac1{k^\alpha} - \int_1^n \frac1{x^\alpha}\,dx\right)$$

for 0 < α < 1, with γ as the special case α = 1. Extending for α > 1 gives:

$$\gamma_{\alpha} = \zeta(\alpha) - \frac1{\alpha-1}$$

with again the limit:

$$\gamma = \lim_{a\to 1}\left(\zeta(a) - \frac1{a-1}\right)$$

This can be further generalized to

$$c_f = \lim_{n\to\infty}\left(\sum_{k=1}^n f(k) - \int_1^n f(x)\,dx\right)$$

for some arbitrary decreasing function f. Setting

$$f_n(x) = \frac{(\log x)^n}{x}$$

gives rise to the Stieltjes constants $\gamma_n$, that occur in the Laurent series expansion of the Riemann zeta function:

$$\zeta(1+s)=\frac{1}{s}+\sum_{n=0}^\infty \frac{(-1)^n}{n!} \gamma_n s^n.$$

with $\gamma_0 = \gamma = 0.577\dots$

n	approximate value of γ_{n}	OEIS
0	+0.5772156649015	A001620
1	−0.0728158454836	A082633
2	−0.0096903631928	A086279
3	+0.0020538344203	A086280
4	+0.0023253700654	A086281
100	−4.2534015717080 × 10^{17}	
1000	−1.5709538442047 × 10^{486}	

=== Euler–Lehmer constants ===
Euler–Lehmer constants are given by summation of inverses of numbers in a common modulo class:

$$\gamma(a,q) = \lim_{x\to \infty}\left (\sum_{0<n\le x \atop n\equiv a \pmod q} \frac1{n}-\frac{\log x}{q}\right).$$

The basic properties are

$$\begin{align}
&\gamma(0,q) = \frac{\gamma -\log q}{q}, \\
&\sum_{a=0}^{q-1} \gamma(a,q)=\gamma, \\
&q\gamma(a,q) = \gamma-\sum_{j=1}^{q-1}e^{-\frac{2\pi aij}{q}}\log\left(1-e^{\frac{2\pi ij}{q}}\right),
\end{align}$$

and if the greatest common divisor gcd(a,q) = d then

$$q\gamma(a,q) = \frac{q}{d}\gamma\left(\frac{a}{d},\frac{q}{d}\right)-\log d.$$

=== Masser–Gramain constant ===
A two-dimensional generalization of Euler's constant is the Masser–Gramain constant. It is defined as the following limiting difference:

$$\delta = \lim_{n\to\infty} \left( -\log n + \sum_{k=2}^n \frac{1}{\pi r_k^2} \right)$$

where $r_k$ is the smallest radius of a disk in the complex plane containing at least $k$ Gaussian integers.

The following bounds have been established: $1.819776 < \delta < 1.819833$.

== See also ==
- Harmonic series
- Meissel-Mertens constant
- Riemann zeta function
- Stieltjes constants
- List of topics named after Leonhard Euler
