= Roger Apéry =

French mathematician (1916–1994)

- Born: 14 November 1916; Rouen, France
- Died: 18 December 1994 (aged 78); Caen, France
- Education: Lycée Louis-le-Grand; École normale supérieure
- Occupation: Mathematician

Roger Apéry (French: [apeʁi]; 14 November 1916 – 18 December 1994) was a Greek-French mathematician most remembered for Apéry's theorem, which states that ζ(3) is an irrational number. Here, ζ(s) denotes the Riemann zeta function.

== Biography ==
Apéry was born in Rouen in 1916 to a French mother and Greek father. His childhood was spent in Lille until 1926, when the family moved to Paris, where he studied at the Lycée Ledru-Rollin and the Lycée Louis-le-Grand. He was admitted at the École normale supérieure in 1935. His studies were interrupted at the start of World War II; he was mobilized in September 1939, taken prisoner of war in June 1940, repatriated with pleurisy in June 1941, and hospitalized until August 1941. He wrote his doctoral thesis in algebraic geometry under the direction of Paul Dubreil and René Garnier in 1947.

In 1947 Apéry was appointed Maître de conférences (lecturer) at the University of Rennes. In 1949 he was appointed Professor at the University of Caen, where he remained until his retirement.

In 1979 he published an unexpected proof of the irrationality of ζ(3), which is the sum of the inverses of the cubes of the positive integers. An indication of the difficulty is that the corresponding problem for other odd powers remains unsolved. Nevertheless, many mathematicians have since worked on the so-called Apéry sequences to seek alternative proofs that might apply to other odd powers (Frits Beukers, Alfred van der Poorten, Marc Prévost, Keith Ball, Tanguy Rivoal, Wadim Zudilin, and others).

Apéry was active in politics and for a few years in the 1960s was president of the Calvados Radical Party of the Left. He abandoned politics after the reforms instituted by Edgar Faure after the 1968 revolt, when he realised that university life was running against the tradition he had always upheld.

== Personal life ==
Apéry married in 1947 and had three sons, including mathematician François Apéry. His first marriage ended in divorce in 1971. He then remarried in 1972 and divorced in 1977.

In 1994, Apéry died from Parkinson's disease after a long illness in Caen. He was buried next to his parents at the Père Lachaise Cemetery in Paris. His tombstone has a mathematical inscription stating his theorem.

$$1 + \frac{1}{8} + \frac{1}{27} + \frac{1}{64} + \cdots \neq \frac{p}{q}$$

== See also ==
- Apéry's constant
- Basel problem
