= Apéry's theorem =

Sum of the inverses of the positive integers cubed is irrational

In mathematics, Apéry's theorem is a result in number theory which states that Apéry's constant ζ(3) is irrational. That is, the number

$$\zeta(3) = \sum_{n=1}^\infty \frac{1}{n^3} = \frac{1}{1^3} + \frac{1}{2^3} + \frac{1}{3^3} + \cdots = 1.2020569\ldots$$

cannot be written as a fraction $p/q$ where p and q are integers. The theorem is named after Roger Apéry.

The special values of the Riemann zeta function at even integers $2n$ ($n > 0$) can be shown in terms of Bernoulli numbers to be irrational, while it remains open whether the function's values are in general rational or not at the odd integers $2n+1$ ($n > 1$) (though they are conjectured to be irrational).

== History ==
Leonhard Euler proved that if n is a positive integer then

$$\frac{1}{1^{2n}} + \frac{1}{2^{2n}} + \frac{1}{3^{2n}} + \frac{1}{4^{2n}} + \cdots = \frac{p}{q}\pi^{2n}$$

for some rational number $p/q$. Specifically, writing the infinite series on the left as $\zeta(2n)$, he showed

$$\zeta(2n) = (-1)^{n+1}\frac{B_{2n}(2\pi)^{2n}}{2(2n)!}$$

where the $B_n$ are the rational Bernoulli numbers. Once it was proved that $\pi^n$ is always irrational, this showed that $\zeta(2n)$ is irrational for all positive integers n.

No such representation in terms of π is known for the so-called zeta constants for odd arguments, the values $\zeta(2n+1)$ for positive integers n. It has been conjectured that the ratios of these quantities

$$\frac{\zeta(2n+1)}{\pi^{2n+1}},$$

are transcendental for every integer $n \ge 1$.

Because of this, no proof could be found to show that the zeta constants with odd arguments were irrational, even though they were (and still are) all believed to be transcendental. However, in June 1978, Roger Apéry gave a talk titled "Sur l'irrationalité de ζ(3)." During the course of the talk he outlined proofs that $\zeta(3)$ and $\zeta(2)$ were irrational, the latter using methods simplified from those used to tackle the former rather than relying on the expression in terms of π. Due to the wholly unexpected nature of the proof and Apéry's blasé and very sketchy approach to the subject, many of the mathematicians in the audience dismissed the proof as flawed. However Henri Cohen, Hendrik Lenstra, and Alfred van der Poorten suspected Apéry was on to something and set out to confirm his proof. Two months later they finished verification of Apéry's proof, and on August 18 Cohen delivered a lecture giving full details of the proof. After the lecture Apéry himself took to the podium to explain the source of some of his ideas.

== Apéry's proof ==
Apéry's original proof was based on the well-known irrationality criterion from Peter Gustav Lejeune Dirichlet, which states that a number $\xi$ is irrational if there are infinitely many coprime integers p and q such that

$$\left|\xi-\frac{p}{q}\right|<\frac{c}{q^{1+\delta}}$$

for some fixed c, δ > 0.

The starting point for Apéry was the series representation of $\zeta(3)$ as

$$\zeta(3) = \frac{5}{2} \sum_{n=1}^\infty \frac{(-1)^{n-1}}{n^3\binom{2n}{n}}.$$

Roughly speaking, Apéry then defined a sequence $c_{n,k}$ which converges to $\zeta(3)$ about as fast as the above series, specifically

$$c_{n,k} = \sum_{m=1}^{n}\frac{1}{m^{3}} + \sum_{m=1}^{k}\frac{(-1)^{m-1}}{2m^{3}\binom{n}{m}\binom{n+m}{m}}.$$

He then defined two more sequences $a_n$ and $b_n$ that, roughly, have the quotient $c_{n,k}$. These sequences were

$$a_{n} = \sum_{k=0}^{n}c_{n,k}\binom{n}{k}^{2}\binom{n+k}{k}^{2}$$

and

$$b_{n}=\sum_{k=0}^{n}\binom{n}{k}^{2}\binom{n+k}{k}^{2}.$$

The sequence $\frac{a_n}{b_n}$ converges to $\zeta(3)$ fast enough to apply the criterion, but unfortunately $a_n$ is not an integer after $n=2$. Nevertheless, Apéry showed that even after multiplying $a_n$ and $b_n$ by a suitable integer to cure this problem the convergence was still fast enough to guarantee irrationality.

== Later proofs ==
Within a year of Apéry's result an alternative proof was found by Frits Beukers, who replaced Apéry's series with integrals involving the shifted Legendre polynomials $\tilde{P_{n}}(x)$. Using a representation that would later be generalized to Hadjicostas's formula, Beukers showed that

$$\int_{0}^{1}\int_{0}^{1}\frac{-\log(xy)}{1-xy}\tilde{P_{n}}(x)\tilde{P_{n}}(y)\,dx\,dy=\frac{A_{n}+B_{n}\zeta(3)}{\operatorname{lcm}\left[1,\ldots,n\right]^{3}}$$

for some integers A_{n} and B_{n} (sequences OEIS: A171484 and OEIS: A171485). Using partial integration and the assumption that $\zeta(3)$ was rational and equal to $\frac{a}{b}$, Beukers eventually derived the inequality

$$0<\frac{1}{b}\leq\left|A_{n}+B_{n}\zeta(3)\right|\leq 4\left(\frac{4}{5}\right)^{n}$$

which is a contradiction since the right-most expression tends to zero as $n\to\infty$, and so must eventually fall below $\frac{1}{b}$.

A more recent proof by Wadim Zudilin is more reminiscent of Apéry's original proof, and also has similarities to a fourth proof by Yuri Nesterenko. These later proofs again derive a contradiction from the assumption that $\zeta(3)$ is rational by constructing sequences that tend to zero but are bounded below by some positive constant. They are somewhat less transparent than the earlier proofs, since they rely upon hypergeometric series.

== Higher zeta constants ==
See also Particular values of the Riemann zeta function § Odd positive integers

Apéry and Beukers could simplify their proofs to work on $\zeta(2)$ as well thanks to the series representation

$$\zeta(2)=3\sum_{n=1}^{\infty}\frac{1}{n^{2}\binom{2n}{n}}.$$

Due to the success of Apéry's method a search was undertaken for a number $\xi_5$ with the property that

$$\zeta(5)=\xi_{5}\sum_{n=1}^{\infty}\frac{(-1)^{n-1}}{n^{5}\binom{2n}{n}}.$$

If such a $\xi_5$ were found then the methods used to prove Apéry's theorem would be expected to work on a proof that $\zeta(5)$ is irrational. Unfortunately, extensive computer searching has failed to find such a constant, and in fact it is now known that if $\xi_5$ exists and if it is an algebraic number of degree at most 25, then the coefficients in its minimal polynomial must be enormous, at least $10^{383}$, so extending Apéry's proof to work on the higher odd zeta constants does not seem likely to work.

Work by Wadim Zudilin and Tanguy Rivoal has shown that infinitely many of the numbers $\zeta(2n+1)$ must be irrational, and even that at least one of the numbers $\zeta(5)$, $\zeta(7)$, $\zeta(9)$, and $\zeta(11)$ must be irrational. Their work uses linear forms in values of the zeta function and estimates upon them to bound the dimension of a vector space spanned by values of the zeta function at odd integers. Hopes that Zudilin could cut his list further to just one number did not materialise, but work on this problem is still an active area of research. Higher zeta constants have application to physics: they describe correlation functions in quantum spin chains.
