= Hadjicostas's formula =

In mathematics, Hadjicostas's formula is a formula relating a certain double integral to values of the gamma function and the Riemann zeta function. It is named after Petros Hadjicostas.

== Statement ==
Let s be a complex number with s ≠ -1 and Re(s) > −2. Then

$$\int_0^1\int_0^1 \frac{1-x}{1-xy}(-\log(xy))^s\,dx\,dy=\Gamma(s+2)\left(\zeta(s+2)-\frac{1}{s+1}\right).$$

Here Γ is the Gamma function and ζ is the Riemann zeta function.

== Background ==
The first instance of the formula was proved and used by Frits Beukers in his 1978 paper giving an alternative proof of Apéry's theorem. He proved the formula when s = 0, and proved an equivalent formulation for the case s = 1. This led Petros Hadjicostas to conjecture the above formula in 2004, and within a week it had been proven by Robin Chapman. He proved the formula holds when Re(s) > −1, and then extended the result by analytic continuation to get the full result.

== Special cases ==
As well as the two cases used by Beukers to get alternate expressions for ζ(2) and ζ(3), the formula can be used to express the Euler–Mascheroni constant as a double integral by letting s tend to −1:

$$\gamma=\int_0^1\int_0^1\frac{1-x}{(1-xy)(-\log(xy))}\,dx\,dy.$$

The latter formula was first discovered by Jonathan Sondow and is the one referred to in the title of Hadjicostas's paper.

== See also ==
- Hessami Pilehrood, Kh.; Hessami Pilehrood, T. (2008). "Vacca-type series for values of the generalized-Euler-constant function and its derivative". arXiv:0808.0410 [math.NT].
- Sondow, J (2005). "Double integrals for Euler's constant and ln 4/π and an analog of Hadjicostas's formula". American Mathematical Monthly. 112: 61–65. arXiv:math.CA/0211148. doi:10.2307/30037385. JSTOR 30037385.
- Sondow, Jonathan; Hadjicostas, Petros (2008). "The generalized-Euler-constant function γ(z) and a generalization of Somos's quadratic recurrence constant". Journal of Mathematical Analysis and Applications. 332: 292–314. arXiv:math/0610499. doi:10.1016/j.jmaa.2006.09.081.
