= Gompertz constant =

Special constant related to the exponential integral

In mathematics, the Gompertz constant or Euler–Gompertz constant, denoted by $\delta$, appears in integral evaluations and as a value of special functions. It is named after Benjamin Gompertz.

It can be defined via the exponential integral as:

$$\delta = -e\operatorname{Ei}(-1)=\int_0^\infty\frac{e^{-x}}{1+x}dx.$$

The numerical value of $\delta$ is about

δ = 0.596347362323194074341078499369... (sequence A073003 in the OEIS).

== History ==
When Euler studied divergent infinite series, he encountered $\delta$ via, for example, the above integral representation. Le Lionnais called $\delta$ the Gompertz constant because of its role in survival analysis.

In 1962, Shidlovski proved that at least one of the Euler–Mascheroni constant and the Euler–Gompertz constant is irrational. This result was improved in 2012 by Tanguy Rivoal, who proved that at least one of them is transcendental.

== Identities involving the Gompertz constant ==
The most frequent appearance of $\delta$ is in the following integrals:

$$\delta = \int_0^\infty\ln(1+x)e^{-x}dx = \int_0^1\frac{1}{1-\ln(x)}dx$$

which follow from the definition of δ by integration of parts and a variable substitution respectively.

Applying the Taylor expansion of $\operatorname{Ei}$ we have the series representation

$$\delta = -e\left(\gamma+\sum_{n=1}^\infty\frac{(-1)^n}{n\cdot n!}\right).$$

Gompertz's constant is connected to the Gregory coefficients via the following formula:

$$\delta = \sum_{n=0}^\infty\frac{\ln(n+1)}{n!}-\sum_{n=0}^\infty C_{n+1}\{e\cdot n!\}-\frac{1}{2}.$$

The Gompertz constant also happens to be the regularized value of the summation of alternating factorials of all natural numbers (1 − 1 + 2 − 6 + 24 − 120 + ⋯), which is defined by Borel summation:

$$\delta = \sum_{k=0}^{\infty} (-1)^k k!$$

It is also related to several polynomial continued fractions:

$$\frac1\delta = 2-\cfrac{1^2}{4-\cfrac{2^2}{6-\cfrac{3^2}{8-\cfrac{4^2}{\ddots \cfrac{n^2}{2(n+1)-\dots}}}}}$$
$$\frac1\delta = 1+\cfrac{1}{1+\cfrac{1}{1+\cfrac{2}{1+\cfrac{2}{1+\cfrac{3}{1+\cfrac{3}{1+\cfrac{4}{\dots}}}}}}}$$
$$\frac{1}{1-\delta} = 3-\cfrac{2}{5-\cfrac{6}{7-\cfrac{12}{9-\cfrac{20}{\ddots \cfrac{n(n+1)}{2n+3-\dots}}}}}$$
