= Jesús Guillera =

Spanish mathematician (1955–2026)

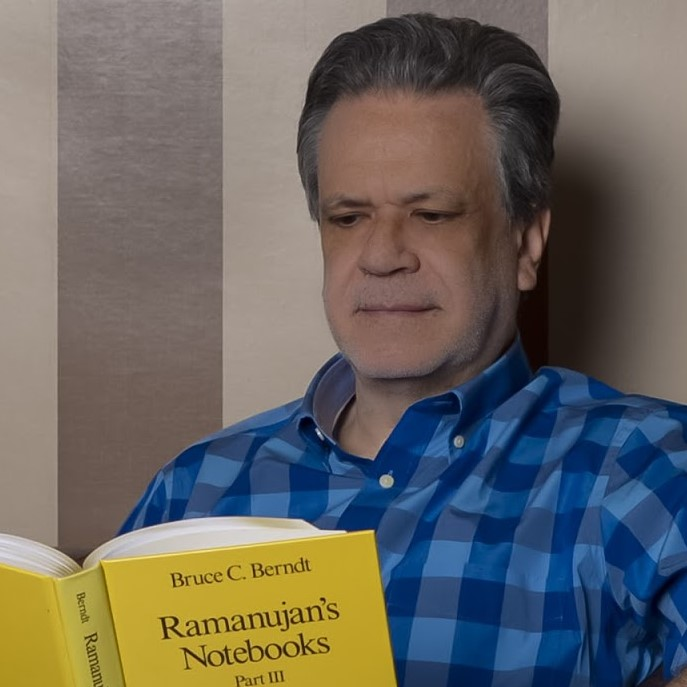
- Guillera in 2024
- Born: 31 December 1955; Zaragoza, Spain
- Died: 9 February 2026 (aged 70)
- Education: University of Zaragoza
- Known for: Ramanujan-type series for π
- Scientific career
- Fields: Mathematics, number theory
- Website: anamat.unizar.es/jguillera/

Jesús Guillera (31 December 1955 – 9 February 2026) was a Spanish mathematician who specialised in number theory, best known for his work on Ramanujan-type series for calculating the mathematical constant π. Largely self-taught in advanced mathematics, he later earned a doctorate from the University of Zaragoza and since then published extensively on hypergeometric identities, WZ-pairs, and related topics in analytic number theory.

== Education and career ==
Guillera obtained a Bachelor of Science in Physics from the University of Zaragoza in 1979. For much of his career, he taught physics and mathematics at secondary schools in the province of Zaragoza. In 2002, Guillera took a medical leave from teaching due to stress and began to devote himself to the study of mathematics, focusing on studying the number π.

Working independently and without formal academic affiliation, Guillera discovered previously unpublished formulas that drew international attention from the mathematical community. In 2007, he earned his PhD in number theory from the University of Zaragoza under the supervision of Eva Gallardo and Wadim Zudilin. His thesis received the distinction cum laude and was awarded the Extraordinary Prize. Guillera had since served as a researcher in the Department of Mathematics at the University of Zaragoza.

== Mathematical work ==
Unlike many mathematicians who spend decades working, often doing their best work when young, Guillera has only been active since the age of 47 when he retired for medical reasons from high-school teaching. Since 2002, he has published over 40 works, and has been cited over 1200 times. His work has been described in some news articles, and some have argued that his talent can be compared to Srinivasa Ramanujan. "“Guillera is our own Ramanujan,” says Javier Cilleruelo, a member of Spain’s Institute of Mathematical Sciences (ICMAT)", while Doron Zeilberger described him as "My great hero Jesús Guillera, a 21st-century incarnation of Ramanujan".

Guillera is known for his contributions to the study of Ramanujan-type series for calculating the number π. In 2002, he discovered several new series of this kind. Many of his formulas initially lacked formal proofs; over time, several were proven using the Wilf–Zeilberger pair method. He has also contributed to developing a general methodology for generating new Ramanujan-type series.

His research collaborations have included work with mathematicians such as Wadim Zudilin, and he has received support from figures like Doron Zeilberger.

== Death ==
Guillera died on 9 February 2026, at the age of 70.

== Selected publications ==
- Guillera, Jesús (2002). "Some binomial series obtained by the WZ-method". Advances in Applied Mathematics. 29 (4): 599–603. arXiv:math/0503345. doi:10.1016/S0196-8858(02)00034-9.
- Guillera, Jesús (2010). "On WZ-pairs which prove Ramanujan series". The Ramanujan Journal. 22 (3): 249–259. arXiv:0904.0406. doi:10.1007/s11139-010-9238-1.
- Guillera, Jesús (2011). "A new Ramanujan-like series for 1/π²". The Ramanujan Journal. 26 (3): 369–374. arXiv:1003.1915. doi:10.1007/s11139-010-9259-9.
- Guillera, Jesús (2012). "Mosaic Supercongruences of Ramanujan Type". Experimental Mathematics. 21 (1): 65–68. arXiv:1007.2290. doi:10.1080/10586458.2011.579012.
- Almkvist, Gert; Guillera, Jesús (2012). "Ramanujan-like series for 1/π² and String Theory". Experimental Mathematics. 21 (3): 223–234. arXiv:1009.5202. doi:10.1080/10586458.2012.656059.
- Guillera, Jesús; Zudilin, Wadim (2013). "Ramanujan-type formulae for 1/π: The art of translation". Max Planck Institute for Mathematics Preprint. arXiv:1302.0548.
- Guillera, Jesús (2016). "Some challenging formulas for π". doi:10.13140/RG.2.2.33482.77769.
- Guillera, Jesús (2020). "A method for proving Ramanujan's series for 1/π". The Ramanujan Journal. 52: 421–431. arXiv:1807.07394. doi:10.1007/s11139-018-0113-9.
