= Apéry's constant =

Sum of the inverses of the positive cubes

Apéry's constant is a mathematical constant, defined as the infinite sum of the reciprocals of the cubes of the positive integers. In symbols,

$$\begin{align}
\zeta(3) &= \sum_{n=1}^\infty \frac{1}{n^3}
\end{align}$$

where ζ is the Riemann zeta function. It is approximately

ζ(3) ≈ 1.202056903159594285399738161511449990764986292… (sequence A002117 in the OEIS).

It is named after Roger Apéry, who proved that it is an irrational number.

== Uses ==
Apéry's constant arises naturally in a number of physical problems, including in the second- and third-order terms of the electron's gyromagnetic ratio using quantum electrodynamics. It also arises in the analysis of random minimum spanning trees and in conjunction with the gamma function when solving certain integrals involving exponential functions in a quotient, which appear occasionally in physics, for instance, when evaluating the two-dimensional case of the Debye model and the Stefan–Boltzmann law.

The reciprocal of ζ(3) (0.8319073725807... (sequence A088453 in the OEIS)) is the probability that any three positive integers, chosen at random, will be relatively prime, in the sense that as N approaches infinity, the probability that three positive integers less than N chosen uniformly at random will not share a common prime factor approaches this value. (The probability for n positive integers is 1/ζ(n).) In the same sense, it is the probability that a positive integer chosen at random will not be evenly divisible by the cube of an integer greater than one. (The probability for not having divisibility by an n-th power is 1/ζ(n).)

== Properties ==
Unsolved problem in mathematics
Is Apéry's constant transcendental?
More unsolved problems in mathematics

ζ(3) was named Apéry's constant after the French mathematician Roger Apéry, who proved in 1978 that it is an irrational number. This result is known as Apéry's theorem. The original proof is complex and hard to grasp, and simpler proofs were found later.

Beukers's simplified irrationality proof involves approximating the integrand of the known triple integral for ζ(3),

$$\zeta(3) = \int_0^1 \int_0^1 \int_0^1 \frac{1}{1-xyz}\, dx\, dy\, dz,$$

by the Legendre polynomials. In particular, van der Poorten's article chronicles this approach by noting that

$$I_3 := -\frac{1}{2} \int_0^1 \int_0^1 \frac{P_n(x) P_n(y) \log(xy)}{1-xy}\, dx\, dy = b_n \zeta(3) - a_n,$$

where $|I| \leq \zeta(3) (1-\sqrt{2})^{4n}$, $P_n(z)$ are the Legendre polynomials, and the subsequences $b_n, 2 \operatorname{lcm}(1,2,\ldots,n) \cdot a_n \in \mathbb{Z}$ are integers or almost integers.

Many people have tried to extend Apéry's proof that ζ(3) is irrational to other values of the Riemann zeta function with odd arguments. Although this has so far not produced any results on specific numbers, it is known that infinitely many of the odd zeta constants ζ(2n + 1) are irrational, and that at least one of ζ(5), ζ(7), ζ(9), and ζ(11) must be irrational.

Apéry's constant has not yet been proved transcendental, but it is known to be an algebraic period. This follows immediately from the form of its triple integral.

== Series representations ==
=== Classical ===
In addition to the fundamental series:

$$\zeta(3) = \sum_{k=1}^\infty \frac{1}{k^3},$$

Leonhard Euler gave the series representation:

$$\zeta(3) = \frac{\pi^2}{7} \left(1 - 4\sum_{k=1}^\infty \frac{\zeta (2k)}{2^{2k}(2k + 1)(2k + 2)}\right)$$

in 1772, which was subsequently rediscovered several times.

=== Fast convergence ===
Since the 19th century, a number of mathematicians have found convergence acceleration series for calculating decimal places of ζ(3). Since the 1990s, this search has focused on computationally efficient series with fast convergence rates (see section "Known digits").

The following series representation was found by Andrey Markov in 1890, rediscovered by Hjortnaes in 1953, and rediscovered once more and widely advertised by Apéry in 1979:

$$\zeta(3) = \frac{5}{2} \sum_{k=1}^\infty (-1)^{k-1} \frac{k!^2}{(2k)! k^3}.$$

The following series representation gives (asymptotically) 1.43 new correct decimal places per term:

$$\zeta(3) = \frac{1}{4} \sum_{k=1}^\infty (-1)^{k-1} \frac{(k - 1)!^3 (56k^2 - 32k + 5)}{(2k - 1)^2(3k)!}.$$

The following series representation gives (asymptotically) 3.01 new correct decimal places per term:

$$\zeta(3) = \frac{1}{64} \sum_{k=0}^\infty (-1)^k \frac{k!^{10} (205k^2 + 250k + 77)}{(2k + 1)!^5}.$$

The following series representation gives (asymptotically) 3.92 new correct decimal places per term:

$$\zeta(3) = \frac{1}{2} \sum_{k=0}^\infty \frac{(-1)^k (2k)!^3 (k + 1)!^6 (40885k^5 + 124346k^4 + 150160k^3 + 89888k^2 + 26629k + 3116)}{(k + 1)^2 (3k + 3)!^4}.$$

The following series representation gives (asymptotically) 5.04 new correct decimal places per term:

$$\zeta(3) = \frac{1}{24} \sum_{k=0}^\infty (-1)^k \frac{(2k + 1)!^3 (2k)!^3 k!^3 (126392k^5 + 412708k^4 + 531578k^3 + 336367k^2 + 104000k + 12463)}{(3k + 2)! (4k + 3)!^3}.$$

It has been used to calculate Apéry's constant with several million correct decimal places.

=== Digit by digit ===
In 1998, Broadhurst gave a series representation that allows arbitrary binary digits to be computed, and thus, for the constant to be obtained by a spigot algorithm in nearly linear time and logarithmic space.

=== Others ===
The following series representation was found by Ramanujan:

$$\zeta(3) = \frac{7}{180} \pi^3 - 2 \sum_{k=1}^\infty \frac{1}{k^3 (e^{2\pi k} - 1)}.$$

The following series representation was found by Simon Plouffe in 1998:

$$\zeta(3) = 14 \sum_{k=1}^\infty \frac{1}{k^3 \sinh(\pi k)} - \frac{11}{2} \sum_{k=1}^\infty \frac{1}{k^3 (e^{2\pi k} - 1)} - \frac{7}{2} \sum_{k=1}^\infty \frac{1}{k^3 (e^{2\pi k} + 1)}.$$

Srivastava (2000) collected many series that converge to Apéry's constant.

== Integral representations ==
There are numerous integral representations for Apéry's constant. Some of them are simple, others are more complicated.

=== Simple formulas ===
The following formula follows directly from the integral definition of the zeta function:

$$\zeta(3) = \frac1{2}\int_0^\infty \frac{x^2}{e^x - 1} \,dx$$

=== More complicated formulas ===
Other formulas include

$$\zeta(3) = \pi \int_0^\infty \frac{\cos(2\arctan x)}{(x^2 + 1) \left(\cosh\frac{1}{2}\pi x\right)^2} \,dx$$

and

$$\zeta(3) = -\frac{1}{2} \int_0^1 \!\!\int_0^1 \frac{\log(xy)}{1 - xy} \,dx\,dy = -\int_0^1 \!\!\int_0^1 \frac{\log(1 - xy)}{xy} \,dx\,dy.$$

Also,

$$\begin{align}
\zeta(3) &= \frac{8\pi^2}{7} \int_0^1 \frac{x(x^4 - 4x^2 + 1) \log\log\frac{1}{x}}{(1 + x^2)^4} \,dx \\
&= \frac{8\pi^2}{7} \int_1^\infty \frac{x(x^4 - 4x^2 + 1) \log\log{x}}{(1 + x^2)^4} \,dx.
\end{align}$$

A connection to the derivatives of the gamma function

$$\zeta(3) = -\tfrac{1}{2}(\Gamma'''(1) + \gamma^3+ \tfrac{1}{2}\pi^2\gamma) = -\tfrac{1}{2} \psi^{(2)}(1)$$

is also very useful for the derivation of various integral representations via the known integral formulas for the gamma and polygamma functions.

== Continued fraction ==
Apéry's constant is related to the following continued fraction:

$$\frac{6}{\zeta(3)}=5-\cfrac{1}{117-\cfrac{64}{535-\cfrac{729}{1436-\cfrac{4096}{3105-\cfrac{15625}{\dots}}}}}$$

with $a_n=34n^3+51n^2+27n+5$ and $b_n=-n^6$.

Its simple continued fraction is given by:

$$\zeta(3)=1+\cfrac{1}{4+\cfrac{1}{1+\cfrac{1}{18+\cfrac{1}{1+\cfrac{1}{1+\cfrac{1}{\dots}}}}}}$$

Other formulas are given by:

$$\zeta(3)=G_{0}}, G_{k}=1+\frac{1}{4+\frac{1}{1+\frac{(k+1)^3}{(k+1)(2k+3)(2k+4)+\frac{(k+2)^3}{G_{k+1}}}}$$
$$\zeta(3)=\frac{6}{W_{0}}, W_{k}=4(2k+1)^3+\frac{(k+1)^3}{1+\frac{(k+1)^3}{W_{k+1}}{}}$$

$$2\zeta(3)=2+\frac{1}{N_{0}}, N_{k}=2k+2+\frac{(k+1)(k+2)}{2k+4+\frac{(k+1)^2}{2k+3+\frac{(k+2)^2}{2k+2+\frac{(k+1)(k+2)}{N_{k+1}}}}}$$

$$2\zeta(3)=2+\frac{42}{H_{0}}, H_{k}=a(k)-\frac{b(k)}{H_{k+1}}$$

with

$$a(k)=2(102k^6+612k^5+1462k^4+1768k^3+1143k^2+382k+52)$$
$$b(k)=(k+1)^3(k+2)^3(2k+1)(2k+5)(3k^2+3k+1)(3k^2+15k+19)$$

$$2\zeta(3)=\frac{7}{6}+\frac{73}{12*S_{0}}, S_{k}=a(k)-\frac{b(k)}{S_{k+1}}$$

with

$$a(k)=2(204k^6+1173k^5+2668k^4+3065k^3+1905k^2+634k+86)$$
$$b(k)=\frac{(k+1)^3(k+2)^3}{4}(24k^3+30k^2+16k+3)(24k^3+174k^2+424k+347)$$

== Known digits ==
The number of known digits of Apéry's constant ζ(3) has increased dramatically during the last decades, and now stands at more than 2×10^{12}. This is due both to the increasing performance of computers and to algorithmic improvements.

Number of known decimal digits of Apéry's constant ζ(3)
| Date | Decimal digits | Computation performed by |
|---|---|---|
| 1735 | 16 | Leonhard Euler |
| Unknown | 16 | Adrien-Marie Legendre |
| 1887 | 32 | Thomas Joannes Stieltjes |
| 1996 | 520000 | Greg J. Fee & Simon Plouffe |
| 1997 | 1000000 | Bruno Haible & Thomas Papanikolaou |
| May 1997 | 10536006 | Patrick Demichel |
| February 1998 | 14000074 | Sebastian Wedeniwski |
| March 1998 | 32000213 | Sebastian Wedeniwski |
| July 1998 | 64000091 | Sebastian Wedeniwski |
| December 1998 | 128000026 | Sebastian Wedeniwski |
| September 2001 | 200001000 | Shigeru Kondo & Xavier Gourdon |
| February 2002 | 600001000 | Shigeru Kondo & Xavier Gourdon |
| February 2003 | 1000000000 | Patrick Demichel & Xavier Gourdon |
| April 2006 | 10000000000 | Shigeru Kondo & Steve Pagliarulo |
| January 21, 2009 | 15510000000 | Alexander J. Yee & Raymond Chan |
| February 15, 2009 | 31026000000 | Alexander J. Yee & Raymond Chan |
| September 17, 2010 | 100000001000 | Alexander J. Yee |
| September 23, 2013 | 200000001000 | Robert J. Setti |
| August 7, 2015 | 250000000000 | Ron Watkins |
| December 21, 2015 | 400000000000 | Dipanjan Nag |
| August 13, 2017 | 500000000000 | Ron Watkins |
| May 26, 2019 | 1000000000000 | Ian Cutress |
| July 26, 2020 | 1200000000100 | Seungmin Kim |
| December 22, 2023 | 2020569031595 | Andrew Sun |

== See also ==
- Riemann zeta function
- Basel problem — ζ(2)
- Catalan's constant
- List of sums of reciprocals
