= Tanguy Rivoal =

French number theorist

- Born: 1972 (age 53–54); France
- Education: Université de Caen Normandie
- Known for: Riemann zeta function
- Scientific career
- Fields: Mathematics
- Workplaces: Centre National de la Recherche Scientifique (CNRS); Université Grenoble Alpes
- Thesis: Propriétés diophantiennes de la fonction zêta de Riemann aux entiers impairs (2001)
- Doctoral advisor: Francesco Amoroso

Tanguy Rivoal (born 1972) is a French mathematician specializing in number theory and related fields. He is known for his work on transcendental numbers, special functions, and Diophantine approximation. He currently holds the position of Directeur de recherche (Research Director) at the Centre National de la Recherche Scientifique (CNRS) and is affiliated with the Université Grenoble Alpes.

== Education ==
Rivoal obtained his Ph.D. from the Université de Caen Normandie in 2001 under the supervision of Francesco Amoroso. His dissertation was titled Propriétés diophantiennes de la fonction zêta de Riemann aux entiers impairs (Diophantine properties of the Riemann zeta function at odd integers).

== Research ==
Rivoal's research focuses on several areas of mathematics, including Diophantine approximation, Padé approximation, arithmetic Gevrey series, values of the Gamma function, transcendental number theory, and E-function. His notable contributions include the proof that there is at least one irrational number among nine numbers ζ(5), ζ(7), ζ(9), ζ(11), ..., ζ(21), where ζ is the Riemann zeta function.

Together with Keith Ball, Rivoal proved that an infinite number of values of ζ at odd integers are linearly independent over $\Q$, for which he was elected an Honorary Fellow of the Hardy-Ramanujan Society. They also proved that there exists an odd number j such that 1, ζ(3), and ζ(j) are linear independent over $\Q$ where 2 < j < 170, a specific case of the more general folklore conjecture stating that π, ζ(3), ζ(5), ζ(7), ζ(9), ..., are algebraically independent over $\Q$, which is a consequence of Grothendieck's period conjecture for mixed Tate motives.

== See also ==
- Apéry's constant
- Apéry's theorem
- Particular values of the Riemann zeta function
- Wadim Zudilin
