= Yuri Nesterenko (mathematician) =

Soviet and Russian mathematician

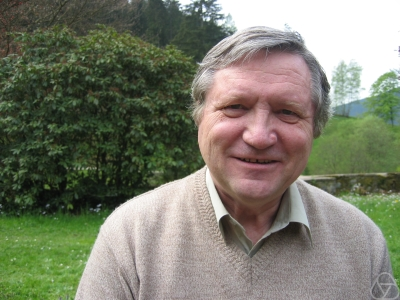
Nesterenko at the workshop "Diophantic Approximations" in Oberwolfach, 2007

Yuri Valentinovich Nesterenko (Russian: Ю́рий Валенти́нович Нестере́нко; born 5 December 1946 in Kharkov, USSR, now Ukraine) is a Soviet and Russian mathematician who has written papers in algebraic independence theory and transcendental number theory.

In 1997, he was awarded the Ostrowski Prize for his proof that the numbers $\pi$ and $e^\pi$ are algebraically independent. In fact, he proved the stronger result:

- the numbers $\pi, e^\pi$, and $\Gamma$$(1/4)$ are algebraically independent over $\mathbb{Q}.$
- the numbers $\pi, e^{\pi\sqrt{3}}$, and $\Gamma(1/3)$ are algebraically independent over $\mathbb{Q}.$
- for all positive integers n, the numbers $\pi$ and $e^{\pi\sqrt{n}}$ are algebraically independent over $\mathbb{Q}.$

Nesterenko is a professor at Moscow State University, where he completed the mechanical-mathematical program in 1969, then the doctorate program (Soviet habilitation) in 1973, and became a professor of the Number Theory Department in 1992.

He studied under Andrei Borisovich Shidlovskii. Nesterenko's students have included Wadim Zudilin.

== Publications ==
- Nesterenko, Y. (1996). "Modular Functions and Transcendence Problems". Comptes Rendus de l'Académie des Sciences, Série I. 322 (10): 909–914.
