= Pietro Mengoli =

Italian mathematician (1626–1686)

The Reverend Pietro Mengoli
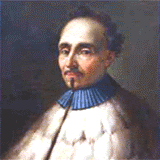
- Born: 1626; Bologna, Papal States
- Died: 7 June 1686 (aged 59–60); Bologna, Papal States
- Resting place: Santa Maria Maddalena, Bologna
- Education: University of Bologna
- Scientific career
- Fields: Mathematics; Logic
- Workplaces: University of Bologna
- Academic advisors: Bonaventura Cavalieri

Ecclesiastical career
- Religion: Christianity
- Church: Catholic Church
- Ordained: 1660

Pietro Mengoli (1626 – June 7, 1686) was an Italian mathematician and Catholic priest from Bologna, where he studied with Bonaventura Cavalieri at the University of Bologna, and succeeded him in 1647. He remained as professor there for the next 39 years of his life.

Mengoli was a pivotal figure in the development of calculus. He established the divergence of the harmonic series nearly forty years before Jacob Bernoulli, to whom the discovery is generally attributed; he gave a development in series of logarithms thirteen years before Nicholas Mercator published his famous treatise Logarithmotechnia. Mengoli also gave a definition of the definite integral not substantially different from that given more than a century later by Augustin-Louis Cauchy.

== Biography ==
Pietro Mengoli was born in 1626 in Bologna. He studied mathematics and mechanics at the University of Bologna. After the death of his teacher, Bonaventura Cavalieri (1647), Mengoli became a lecturer in the new chair of mechanics from 1649 to 1650 and subsequently taught mathematics at the University of Bologna in the years from 1678 to 1685. He was awarded a doctorate in philosophy in 1650, and, three years later, in civil and canon law. Novae quadraturae arithmeticae (1650), Via regia ad mathematicas (1655) and Geometria (1659), his earliest writings, earned him wide reputation in Europe, especially in academic circles in London.

In 1660, he was ordained a Catholic priest. A decade of silence followed until, in 1670, the Speculationi di musica and Refrattioni e parallasse solare were published. During the 1670s, Mengoli devoted himself to constructing a theory of metaphysics, in which he tried to demonstrate revealed truths more geometrico. Circolo (1672), Anno (1673), Arithmetica rationalis (1674) and Il mese (1681) are works devoted to the topics of "middle mathematics', cosmology and biblical chronology, logic and metaphysics. Mengoli wrote also a treatise on music theory, Speculazioni di musica [Speculations on music], much appreciated in his time and reviewed and partly translated by Henry Oldenburg in the Philosophical Transactions of the Royal Society. Mengoli died in Bologna in 1685.

== Contributions ==
Mengoli first posed the famous Basel problem in 1650, solved in 1735 by Leonhard Euler. In 1650, he also proved that the sum of the alternating harmonic series is equal to the natural logarithm of 2.

He also proved that the harmonic series has no upper bound, and provided a proof that Wallis' product for $\pi$ is correct.

Mengoli anticipated the modern idea of limit of a sequence with his study of quasi-proportions in Geometriae speciosae elementa (1659). He used the term quasi-infinite for unbounded and quasi-null for vanishing.

Mengoli proves theorems starting from clear hypotheses and explicitly stated properties, showing everything necessary ... proceeds to a step-by-step demonstration. In the margin he notes the theorems used in each line. Indeed, the work bears many similarities to a modern book and shows that Mengoli was ahead of his time in treating his subject with a high degree of rigor.

== Six square problem ==
Mengoli became enthralled with a Diophantine problem posed by Jacques Ozanam called the six-square problem: find three integers such that their differences are squares and that the differences of their squares are also three squares. At first he thought that there was no solution, and in 1674, published his reasoning in Theorema Arthimeticum. But Ozanam then exhibited a solution: x = 2,288,168, y = 1,873,432, and z = 2,399,057. Humbled by his error, Mengoli made a study of Pythagorean triples to uncover the basis of this solution. He first solved an auxiliary Diophantine problem: find four numbers such that the sum of the first two is a square, the sum of the third and fourth is a square, their product is a square, and the ratio of the first two is greater than the ratio of the third to the fourth. He found two solutions: (112, 15, 35, 12) and (364, 27, 84, 13). Using these quadruples, and algebraic identities, he gave two solutions to the six-square problem beyond Ozanam's solutions. Jacques de Billy also provided six-square problem solutions.

== Works ==
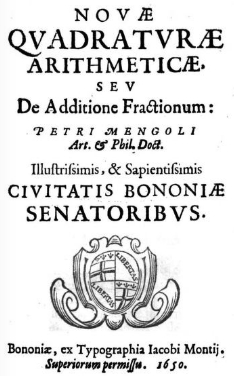
Title-page from Novae quadraturae arithmeticae, by Pietro Mengoli. 1650.

Pietro Mengoli's works were all published in Bologna:

- 1650: Novae quadraturae arithmeticae seu de additione fractionum on infinite series
- 1659: Geometriae speciosae elementa on quasi-proportions to extend Euclid's proportionality of his Book 5, six definitions yield 61 theorems on quasi-proportion
- 1670: Refrattitione e parallase solare
- 1670: Speculattione di musica
- 1672: Circulo
- 1675: Anno on Biblical chronology
- 1681: Mese on cosmology
- Mese (in Italian). Bologna: eredi Vittorio Benacci. 1681.
- 1674: Arithmetica rationalis on logic
- 1675: Arithmetica realis on metaphysics

== Bibliography ==
- Natucci, Alpinolo (1974). "Mengoli, Pietro". In Charles Coulston Gillispie (ed.). Dictionary of Scientific Biography. Vol. IX. New York: Charles Scribner's Sons. pp. 303–304.
- G. Baroncini; M. Cavazza, eds. (1986). La Corrispondenza di Pietro Mengoli. Florence: Leo S. Olschki. ISBN 9788822234049.
- "Mengoli, Pietro". Biographical Encyclopedia of Scientists. CRC Press. 2008. p. 518. ISBN 978-1-4200-7272-3.
