= Wadim Zudilin =

Russian number theorist

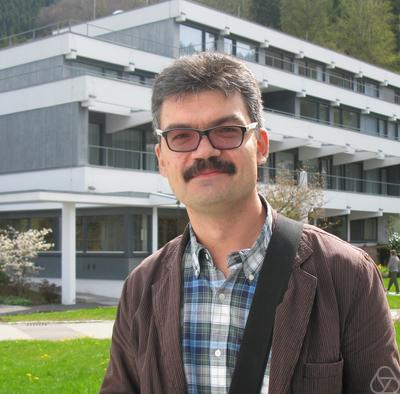
Wadim Zudilin

Wadim Zudilin (Вадим Валентинович Зудилин) is a Russian mathematician and number theorist who is active in studying hypergeometric functions and zeta constants. He studied under Yuri V. Nesterenko and worked at Moscow State University, the Steklov Institute of Mathematics, the Max Planck Institute for Mathematics and the University of Newcastle, Australia. He works at Radboud University Nijmegen in the Netherlands.

He has reproved Apéry's theorem that ζ(3) is irrational, and expanded it. Zudilin proved that at least one of the four numbers ζ(5), ζ(7), ζ(9), or ζ(11) is irrational. For that accomplishment, he won the Distinguished Award of the Hardy-Ramanujan Society in 2001.

With Doron Zeilberger, Zudilin improved the known upper bound of the irrationality measure for π, which as of November 2022 is the current best estimate.
