= Basel problem =

Sum of inverse squares of natural numbers

The Basel problem is analogous to the total apparent brightness of infinite identical point light sources on the number line viewed from the origin (top figure), compared to a single light source at position 1 (bottom)

The Basel problem is a problem in mathematical analysis with relevance to number theory, concerning an infinite sum of inverse squares. It was first posed by Pietro Mengoli in 1650 and solved by Leonhard Euler in 1734, and read on 5 December 1735 in The Saint Petersburg Academy of Sciences. Since the problem had withstood the attacks of the leading mathematicians of the day, Euler's solution brought him immediate fame when he was twenty-eight. Euler generalised the problem considerably, and his ideas were taken up more than a century later by Bernhard Riemann in his seminal 1859 paper "On the Number of Primes Less Than a Given Magnitude", in which he defined the Riemann zeta function and proved its basic properties. The problem is named after the city of Basel, hometown of Euler as well as of the Bernoulli family who unsuccessfully attacked the problem.

The Basel problem asks for the precise summation of the reciprocals of the squares of the natural numbers, i.e. the precise sum of the infinite series:
$$\sum_{n=1}^\infty \frac{1}{n^2} = \frac{1}{1^2} + \frac{1}{2^2} + \frac{1}{3^2} + \cdots.$$

The sum of the series is approximately equal to 1.644934. The Basel problem asks for the exact sum of this series (in closed form), as well as a proof that this sum is correct. Euler found the exact sum to be ${\pi^2}/{6}$ and announced this discovery in 1735. His arguments were based on manipulations that were not justified at the time, although he was later proven correct. He produced an accepted proof in 1741.

The solution to this problem can be used to estimate the probability that two large random numbers are coprime. Two random integers in the range from 1 to n, in the limit as n goes to infinity, are relatively prime with a probability that approaches ${6}/{\pi^2}$, the reciprocal of the solution to the Basel problem.

== Euler's approach ==
Euler's original derivation of the value ${\pi^2}/{6}$ essentially extended observations about finite polynomials and assumed that these same properties hold true for infinite series.

Euler's original reasoning requires justification (100 years later, Karl Weierstrass proved that Euler's representation of the sine function as an infinite product is valid, by the Weierstrass factorization theorem), but even without justification, by simply obtaining the correct value, he was able to verify it numerically against partial sums of the series. The agreement he observed gave him sufficient confidence to announce his result to the mathematical community.

To follow Euler's argument, recall the Taylor series expansion of the sine function
$$\sin x = x - \frac{x^3}{3!} + \frac{x^5}{5!} - \frac{x^7}{7!} + \cdots$$
Dividing through by x gives
$$\frac{\sin x}{x} = 1 - \frac{x^2}{3!} + \frac{x^4}{5!} - \frac{x^6}{7!} + \cdots .$$

The Weierstrass factorization theorem shows that the right-hand side is the product of linear factors given by its roots, just as for finite polynomials. Euler assumed this as a heuristic for expanding an infinite degree polynomial in terms of its roots, but in fact it is not always true for general $P(x)$. This factorization expands the equation into:
$$\begin{align}
\frac{\sin x}{x} &= \left(1 - \frac{x}{\pi}\right)\left(1 + \frac{x}{\pi}\right)\left(1 - \frac{x}{2\pi}\right)\left(1 + \frac{x}{2\pi}\right)\left(1 - \frac{x}{3\pi}\right)\left(1 + \frac{x}{3\pi}\right) \cdots \\
&= \left(1 - \frac{x^2}{\pi^2}\right)\left(1 - \frac{x^2}{4\pi^2}\right)\left(1 - \frac{x^2}{9\pi^2}\right) \cdots
\end{align}$$

If we formally multiply out this product and collect all the x^{2} terms (we are allowed to do so because of Newton's identities), we see by induction that the x^{2} coefficient of (sin x)/x is
$$-\left(\frac{1}{\pi^2} + \frac{1}{4\pi^2} + \frac{1}{9\pi^2} + \cdots \right) = -\frac{1}{\pi^2}\sum_{n=1}^{\infty}\frac{1}{n^2}.$$

But from the original infinite series expansion of (sin x)/x, the coefficient of x^{2} is −1/3! = −1/6. These two coefficients must be equal; thus,
$$-\frac{1}{6} = -\frac{1}{\pi^2}\sum_{n=1}^{\infty}\frac{1}{n^2}.$$

Multiplying both sides of this equation by −π^{2} gives the sum of the reciprocals of the positive square integers.
$$\sum_{n=1}^{\infty}\frac{1}{n^2} = \frac{\pi^2}{6}.$$

=== Generalizations of Euler's method using elementary symmetric polynomials ===
Using formulae obtained from elementary symmetric polynomials, this same approach can be used to enumerate formulae for the even-indexed even zeta constants which have the following known formula expanded by the Bernoulli numbers:
$$\zeta(2n) = \frac{(-1)^{n-1} (2\pi)^{2n}}{2 \cdot (2n)!} B_{2n}.$$

For example, let the partial product for $\sin(x)$ expanded as above be defined by $\frac{S_n(x)}{x} = \prod\limits_{k=1}^n \left(1 - \frac{x^2}{k^2 \cdot \pi^2}\right)$. Then using known formulas for elementary symmetric polynomials (a.k.a., Newton's formulas expanded in terms of power sum identities), we can see (for example) that
$$\begin{align}
\left[x^4\right] \frac{S_n(x)}{x} & = \frac{1}{2\pi^4}\left(\left(H_n^{(2)}\right)^2 - H_n^{(4)}\right) \qquad \xrightarrow{n \rightarrow \infty} \qquad \frac{1}{2\pi^4}\left(\zeta(2)^2-\zeta(4)\right) \\[4pt]
& \qquad \implies \zeta(4) = \frac{\pi^4}{90} = -2\pi^4 \cdot [x^4] \frac{\sin(x)}{x} +\frac{\pi^4}{36} \\[8pt]
\left[x^6\right] \frac{S_n(x)}{x} & = -\frac{1}{6\pi^6}\left(\left(H_n^{(2)}\right)^3 - 3H_n^{(2)} H_n^{(4)} + 2H_n^{(6)}\right) \qquad \xrightarrow{n \rightarrow \infty} \qquad \frac{1}{6\pi^6}\left(\zeta(2)^3-3\zeta(2)\zeta(4) + 2\zeta(6)\right) \\[4pt]
& \qquad \implies \zeta(6) = \frac{\pi^6}{945} = -3 \cdot \pi^6 [x^6] \frac{\sin(x)}{x} - \frac{2}{3} \frac{\pi^2}{6} \frac{\pi^4}{90} + \frac{\pi^6}{216},
\end{align}$$

and so on for subsequent coefficients of $[x^{2k}] \frac{S_n(x)}{x}$. There are other forms of Newton's identities expressing the (finite) power sums $H_n^{(2k)}$ in terms of the elementary symmetric polynomials, $e_i \equiv e_i\left(-\frac{\pi^2}{1^2}, -\frac{\pi^2}{2^2}, -\frac{\pi^2}{3^2}, -\frac{\pi^2}{4^2}, \ldots\right),$ but we can go a more direct route to expressing non-recursive formulas for $\zeta(2k)$ using the method of elementary symmetric polynomials. Namely, we have a recurrence relation between the elementary symmetric polynomials and the power sum polynomials given as on this page by
$$(-1)^{k}k e_k(x_1,\ldots,x_n) = \sum_{j=1}^k (-1)^{k-j-1} p_j(x_1,\ldots,x_n)e_{k-j}(x_1,\ldots,x_n),$$

which in our situation equates to the limiting recurrence relation (or generating function convolution, or product) expanded as
$$\frac{\pi^{2k}}{2}\cdot \frac{(2k) \cdot (-1)^k}{(2k+1)!} = -[x^{2k}] \frac{\sin(\pi x)}{\pi x} \times \sum_{i \geq 1} \zeta(2i) x^i.$$

Then by differentiation and rearrangement of the terms in the previous equation, we obtain that
$$\zeta(2k) = [x^{2k}]\frac{1}{2}\left(1-\pi x\cot(\pi x)\right).$$

=== Consequences of Euler's proof ===
By the above results, we can conclude that $\zeta(2k)$ is always a rational multiple of $\pi^{2k}$. In particular, since $\pi$ and integer powers of it are transcendental, we can conclude at this point that $\zeta(2k)$ is irrational, and more precisely, transcendental for all $k \geq 1$. By contrast, the properties of the odd-indexed zeta constants, including Apéry's constant $\zeta(3)$, are almost completely unknown.

== The Riemann zeta function ==
The Riemann zeta function ζ(s) is one of the most significant functions in mathematics because of its relationship to the distribution of the prime numbers. The zeta function is defined for any complex number s with real part greater than 1 by the following formula:
$$\zeta(s) = \sum_{n=1}^\infty \frac{1}{n^s}.$$

Taking s = 2, we see that ζ(2) is equal to the sum of the reciprocals of the squares of all positive integers:
$$\zeta(2) = \sum_{n=1}^\infty \frac{1}{n^2}
= \frac{1}{1^2} + \frac{1}{2^2} + \frac{1}{3^2} + \frac{1}{4^2} + \cdots = \frac{\pi^2}{6} \approx 1.644934.$$

Convergence can be proven by the integral test, or by the following inequality:
$$\begin{align}
\sum_{n=1}^N \frac{1}{n^2} & < 1 + \sum_{n=2}^N \frac{1}{n(n-1)} \\
& = 1 + \sum_{n=2}^N \left( \frac{1}{n-1} - \frac{1}{n} \right) \\
& = 1 + 1 - \frac{1}{N} \;{\stackrel{N \to \infty}{\longrightarrow}}\; 2.
\end{align}$$

This gives us the upper bound 2, and because the infinite sum contains no negative terms, it must converge to a value strictly between 0 and 2. It can be shown that ζ(s) has a simple expression in terms of the Bernoulli numbers whenever s is a positive even integer. With s = 2n:
$$\zeta(2n) = \frac{(2\pi)^{2n}(-1)^{n+1}B_{2n}}{2\cdot(2n)!}.$$

== A proof using Euler's formula and L'Hôpital's rule ==
The normalized sinc function $\text{sinc}(x)=\frac{\sin (\pi x)}{\pi x}$ has a Weierstrass factorization representation as an infinite product:
$$\frac{\sin (\pi x)}{\pi x} = \prod_{n=1}^\infty \left(1-\frac{x^2}{n^2}\right).$$

The infinite product is analytic, so taking the natural logarithm of both sides and differentiating yields
$$\frac{\pi \cos (\pi x)}{\sin (\pi x)}-\frac{1}{x}=-\sum_{n=1}^\infty \frac{2x}{n^2-x^2}$$

(by uniform convergence, the interchange of the derivative and infinite series is permissible). After dividing the equation by $2x$ and regrouping one gets
$$\frac{1}{2x^2}-\frac{\pi \cot (\pi x)}{2x}=\sum_{n=1}^\infty \frac{1}{n^2-x^2}.$$

We make a change of variables ($x=-it$):
$$-\frac{1}{2t^2}+\frac{\pi \cot (-\pi it)}{2it}=\sum_{n=1}^\infty \frac{1}{n^2+t^2}.$$

Euler's formula can be used to deduce that
$$\frac{\pi \cot (-\pi i t)}{2it}=\frac{\pi}{2it}\frac{i\left(e^{2\pi t}+1\right)}{e^{2\pi t}-1}=\frac{\pi}{2t}+\frac{\pi}{t\left(e^{2\pi t} - 1\right)}.$$
or using the corresponding hyperbolic function:
$$\frac{\pi \cot (-\pi i t)}{2it}=\frac{\pi}{2t}{i\cot (\pi i t)}=\frac{\pi}{2t}\coth(\pi t).$$

Then
$$\sum_{n=1}^\infty \frac{1}{n^2+t^2}=\frac{\pi \left(te^{2\pi t}+t\right)-e^{2\pi t}+1}{2\left(t^2 e^{2\pi t}-t^2\right)}=-\frac{1}{2t^2} + \frac{\pi}{2t} \coth(\pi t).$$

Now we take the limit as $t$ approaches zero and use L'Hôpital's rule thrice. By Tannery's theorem applied to $\lim_{t\to\infty}\sum_{n=1}^\infty 1/(n^2+1/t^2)$, we can interchange the limit and infinite series so that $\lim_{t\to 0}\sum_{n=1}^\infty 1/(n^2+t^2)=\sum_{n=1}^\infty 1/n^2$ and by L'Hôpital's rule
$$\begin{align}\sum_{n=1}^\infty \frac{1}{n^2}&=\lim_{t\to 0}\frac{\pi}{4}\frac{2\pi te^{2\pi t}-e^{2\pi t}+1}{\pi t^2 e^{2\pi t} + te^{2\pi t}-t}\\[6pt]
&=\lim_{t\to 0}\frac{\pi^3 te^{2\pi t}}{2\pi \left(\pi t^2 e^{2\pi t}+2te^{2\pi t} \right)+e^{2\pi t}-1}\\[6pt]
&=\lim_{t\to 0}\frac{\pi^2 (2\pi t+1)}{4\pi^2 t^2+12\pi t+6}\\[6pt]
&=\frac{\pi^2}{6}.\end{align}$$

== A proof using Fourier series ==
Use Parseval's identity (applied to the function f(x) = x) to obtain
$$\sum_{n=-\infty}^\infty |c_n|^2 = \frac{1}{2\pi}\int_{-\pi}^\pi x^2 \, dx,$$
where
$$\begin{align}
c_n &= \frac{1}{2\pi}\int_{-\pi}^\pi x e^{-inx} \, dx \\[4pt]
&= \frac{n\pi \cos(n\pi)-\sin(n\pi)}{\pi n^2} i \\[4pt]
&= \frac{\cos(n\pi)}{n} i \\[4pt]
&= \frac{(-1)^n}{n} i
\end{align}$$

for n ≠ 0, and c_{0} = 0. Thus,
$$|c_n|^2 = \begin{cases}
\dfrac{1}{n^2}, & \text{for } n \neq 0, \\
0, & \text{for } n = 0,
\end{cases}$$

and
$$\sum_{n=-\infty}^\infty |c_n|^2 = 2\sum_{n=1}^\infty \frac{1}{n^2} = \frac{1}{2\pi} \int_{-\pi}^\pi x^2 \, dx.$$

Therefore,
$$\sum_{n=1}^\infty \frac{1}{n^2} = \frac{1}{4\pi}\int_{-\pi}^\pi x^2 \, dx = \frac{\pi^2}{6}$$
as required.

== Another proof using Parseval's identity ==
Given a complete orthonormal basis in the space $L^2_{\operatorname{per}}(0, 1)$ of L2 periodic functions over $(0, 1)$ (i.e., the subspace of square-integrable functions which are also periodic), denoted by $\{e_i\}_{i=-\infty}^{\infty}$, Parseval's identity tells us that
$$\|x\|^2 = \sum_{i=-\infty}^{\infty} |\langle e_i, x\rangle|^2,$$

where $\|x\| := \sqrt{\langle x,x\rangle}$ is defined in terms of the inner product on this Hilbert space given by
$$\langle f, g\rangle = \int_0^1 f(x) \overline{g(x)} \, dx,\ f,g \in L^2_{\operatorname{per}}(0, 1).$$

We can consider the orthonormal basis on this space defined by $e_k \equiv e_k(\vartheta) := \exp(2\pi\imath k \vartheta)$ such that $\langle e_k,e_j\rangle = \int_0^1 e^{2\pi\imath (k-j) \vartheta} \, d\vartheta = \delta_{k,j}$. Then if we take $f(\vartheta) := \vartheta$, we can compute both that
$$\begin{align}
\|f\|^2 & = \int_0^1 \vartheta^2 \, d\vartheta = \frac{1}{3} \\
\langle f, e_k\rangle & = \int_0^1 \vartheta e^{-2\pi\imath k\vartheta} \, d\vartheta = \Biggl\{\begin{array}{ll} \frac{1}{2}, & k = 0 \\ -\frac{1}{2\pi\imath k} & k \neq 0, \end{array}
\end{align}$$

by elementary calculus and integration by parts, respectively. Finally, by Parseval's identity stated in the form above, we obtain that
$$\begin{align}
\|f\|^2 = \frac{1}{3} & = \sum_{\stackrel{k=-\infty}{k \neq 0}}^{\infty} \frac{1}{(2\pi k)^2}+ \frac{1}{4}
= 2 \sum_{k=1}^{\infty} \frac{1}{(2\pi k)^2}+ \frac{1}{4} \\
& \implies \frac{\pi^2}{6} = \frac{2 \pi^2}{3} - \frac{\pi^2}{2} = \zeta(2).
\end{align}$$

=== Generalizations and recurrence relations ===
Note that by considering higher-order powers of $f_j(\vartheta) := \vartheta^j \in L^2_{\operatorname{per}}(0, 1)$ we can use integration by parts to extend this method to enumerating formulas for $\zeta(2j)$ when $j > 1$. In particular, suppose we let
$$I_{j,k} := \int_0^1 \vartheta^j e^{-2\pi\imath k\vartheta} \, d\vartheta,$$

so that integration by parts yields the recurrence relation that
$$\begin{align}
I_{j,k} & = \begin{cases} \frac{1}{j+1}, & k=0; \\[4pt] -\frac{1}{2\pi\imath \cdot k} + \frac{j}{2\pi\imath \cdot k} I_{j-1,k}, & k \neq 0\end{cases} \\[6pt]
& = \begin{cases} \frac{1}{j+1}, & k=0; \\[4pt] -\sum\limits_{m=1}^j \frac{j!}{(j+1-m)!} \cdot \frac{1}{(2\pi\imath \cdot k)^m}, & k \neq 0. \end{cases}
\end{align}$$

Then by applying Parseval's identity as we did for the first case above along with the linearity of the inner product yields that
$$\begin{align}
\|f_j\|^2 = \frac{1}{2j+1} & = 2 \sum_{k \geq 1} I_{j,k} \bar{I}_{j,k} + \frac{1}{(j+1)^2} \\[6pt]
& = 2 \sum_{m=1}^j \sum_{r=1}^j \frac{j!^2}{(j+1-m)! (j+1-r)!} \frac{(-1)^r}{\imath^{m+r}} \frac{\zeta(m+r)}{(2\pi)^{m+r}} + \frac{1}{(j+1)^2}.
\end{align}$$

== Proof using differentiation under the integral sign ==
It's possible to prove the result using elementary calculus by applying the differentiation under the integral sign technique to an integral due to Freitas:
$$I(\alpha) = \int_0^\infty \ln\left(1+\alpha e^{-x}+e^{-2x}\right)dx.$$

While the primitive function of the integrand cannot be expressed in terms of elementary functions, by differentiating with respect to $\alpha$ we arrive at

$$\frac{dI}{d\alpha} = \int_0^\infty \frac{e^{-x}}{1+\alpha e^{-x}+e^{-2x}}dx,$$
which can be integrated by substituting $u=e^{-x}$ and completing the square. In the range $-2 < \alpha < 2$ the definite integral reduces to

$$\frac{dI}{d\alpha} = \frac{2}{\sqrt{4-\alpha^2}}\left[\arctan\left(\frac{\alpha+2}{\sqrt{4-\alpha^2}}\right)-\arctan\left(\frac{\alpha}{\sqrt{4-\alpha^2}}\right)\right].$$

The expression can be simplified using the arctangent addition formula and integrated with respect to $\alpha$ by means of trigonometric substitution, resulting in

$$I(\alpha) = -\frac{1}{2}\arccos\left(\frac{\alpha}{2}\right)^2 + c.$$

The integration constant $c$ can be determined by noticing that two distinct values of $I(\alpha)$ are related by

$$I(2) = 4I(0),$$
because when calculating $I(2)$ we can factor $1+2e^{-x}+e^{-2x} = (1+e^{-x})^2$ and express it in terms of $I(0)$ using the logarithm of a power identity and the substitution $u=x/2$. This makes it possible to determine $c = \frac{\pi^2}{6}$, and it follows that

$$I(-2) = 2\int_0^\infty \ln(1-e^{-x})dx = -\frac{\pi^2}{3}.$$

This final integral can be evaluated by expanding the natural logarithm into its Taylor series:

$$\int_0^\infty \ln(1-e^{-x})dx = - \sum_{n=1}^\infty \int_0^\infty \frac{e^{-nx}}{n}dx = -\sum_{n=1}^\infty\frac{1}{n^2}.$$

The last two identities imply

$$\sum_{n=1}^\infty\frac{1}{n^2} = \frac{\pi^2}{6}.$$

== Cauchy's proof ==
While most proofs use results from advanced mathematics, such as Fourier analysis, complex analysis, and multivariable calculus, the following does not even require single-variable calculus (until a single limit is taken at the end).

For a proof using the residue theorem, see here.

=== History of this proof ===
The proof goes back to Augustin Louis Cauchy (Cours d'Analyse, 1821, Note VIII). In 1954, this proof appeared in the book of Akiva and Isaak Yaglom "Nonelementary Problems in an Elementary Exposition". Later, in 1982, it appeared in the journal Eureka, attributed to John Scholes, but Scholes claims he learned the proof from Peter Swinnerton-Dyer, and in any case he maintains the proof was "common knowledge at Cambridge in the late 1960s".

=== The proof ===
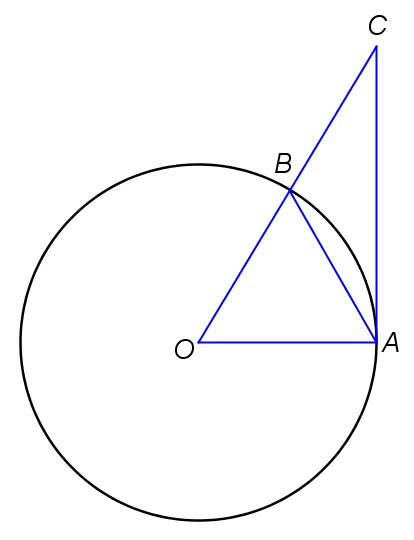
The inequality $\tfrac{1}{2}r^2\tan\theta > \tfrac{1}{2}r^2\theta > \tfrac{1}{2}r^2\sin\theta$ is shown pictorially for any $\theta \in (0, \pi/2)$. The three terms are the areas of the triangle OAC, circle section OAB, and the triangle OAB. Taking reciprocals and squaring gives $\cot^2\theta<\tfrac{1}{\theta^2}<\csc^2\theta$.

The main idea behind the proof is to bound the partial (finite) sums
$$\sum_{k=1}^m \frac{1}{k^2} = \frac{1}{1^2} + \frac{1}{2^2} + \cdots + \frac{1}{m^2}$$
between two expressions, each of which will tend to π^{2}/6 as m approaches infinity. The two expressions are derived from identities involving the cotangent and cosecant functions. These identities are in turn derived from de Moivre's formula, and we now turn to establishing these identities.

Let x be a real number with 0 < x < π/2, and let n be a positive odd integer. Then from de Moivre's formula and the definition of the cotangent function, we have
$$\begin{align}
\frac{\cos (nx) + i \sin (nx)}{\sin^n x} &= \frac{(\cos x + i\sin x)^n}{\sin^n x} \\[4pt]
&= \left(\frac{\cos x + i \sin x}{\sin x}\right)^n \\[4pt]
&= (\cot x + i)^n.
\end{align}$$

From the binomial theorem, we have
$$\begin{align}
(\cot x + i)^n
= & {n \choose 0} \cot^n x + {n \choose 1} (\cot^{n - 1} x)i + \cdots + {n \choose {n - 1}} (\cot x)i^{n - 1} + {n \choose n} i^n \\[6pt]
= & \Bigg( {n \choose 0} \cot^n x - {n \choose 2} \cot^{n - 2} x \pm \cdots \Bigg) \; + \; i\Bigg( {n \choose 1} \cot^{n-1} x - {n \choose 3} \cot^{n - 3} x \pm \cdots \Bigg).
\end{align}$$

Combining the two equations and equating imaginary parts gives the identity
$$\frac{\sin (nx)}{\sin^n x} = \Bigg( {n \choose 1} \cot^{n - 1} x - {n \choose 3} \cot^{n - 3} x \pm \cdots \Bigg).$$

We take this identity, fix a positive integer m, set n = 2m + 1, and consider x_{r} = rπ/(2m + 1) for r = 1, 2, ..., m. Then nx_{r} is a multiple of π and therefore sin(nx_{r}) = 0. So,
$$0 = {{2m + 1} \choose 1} \cot^{2m} x_r - {{2m + 1} \choose 3} \cot^{2m - 2} x_r \pm \cdots + (-1)^m{{2m + 1} \choose {2m + 1}}$$

for every r = 1, 2, ..., m. The values x_{r} = x_{1}, x_{2}, ..., x_{m} are distinct numbers in the interval 0 < x_{r} < π/2. Since the function cot^{2} x is one-to-one on this interval, the numbers t_{r} = cot^{2} x_{r} are distinct for r = 1, 2, ..., m. By the above equation, these m numbers are the roots of the mth degree polynomial
$$p(t) = {{2m + 1} \choose 1}t^m - {{2m + 1} \choose 3}t^{m - 1} \pm \cdots + (-1)^m{{2m+1} \choose {2m + 1}}.$$

By Vieta's formulas we can calculate the sum of the roots directly by examining the first two coefficients of the polynomial, and this comparison shows that
$$\cot ^2 x_1 + \cot ^2 x_2 + \cdots + \cot ^2 x_m = \frac{\binom{2m + 1}3} {\binom{2m + 1}1} = \frac{2m(2m - 1)}6.$$

Substituting the identity csc^{2} x = cot^{2} x + 1, we have
$$\csc ^2 x_1 + \csc ^2 x_2 + \cdots + \csc ^2 x_m = \frac{2m(2m - 1)}6 + m = \frac{2m(2m + 2)}6.$$

Now consider the inequality cot^{2} x < 1/x^{2} < csc^{2} x (illustrated geometrically above). If we add up all these inequalities for each of the numbers x_{r} = rπ/(2m + 1), and if we use the two identities above, we get
$$\frac{2m(2m - 1)}6 < \left(\frac{2m + 1}{\pi} \right)^2 + \left(\frac{2m + 1}{2\pi} \right)^2 + \cdots + \left(\frac{2m + 1}{m \pi} \right)^2 < \frac{2m(2m + 2)}6.$$

Multiplying through by (π/(2m + 1))^{2}, this becomes
$$\frac{\pi ^2}{6}\left(\frac{2m}{2m + 1}\right)\left(\frac{2m - 1}{2m + 1}\right) < \frac{1}{1^2} + \frac{1}{2^2} + \cdots + \frac{1}{m^2} < \frac{\pi ^2}{6}\left(\frac{2m}{2m + 1}\right)\left(\frac{2m + 2}{2m + 1}\right).$$

As m approaches infinity, the left and right hand expressions each approach π^{2}/6, so by the squeeze theorem,
$$\zeta(2) = \sum_{k=1}^\infty \frac{1}{k^2} =
\lim_{m \to \infty}\left(\frac{1}{1^2} + \frac{1}{2^2} + \cdots + \frac{1}{m^2}\right) = \frac{\pi ^2}{6}$$

and this completes the proof.

== Proof assuming Weil's conjecture on Tamagawa numbers ==
A proof is also possible assuming Weil's conjecture on Tamagawa numbers. The conjecture asserts for the case of the algebraic group SL_{2}(R) that the Tamagawa number of the group is one. That is, the quotient of the special linear group over the rational adeles by the special linear group of the rationals (a compact set, because $SL_2(\mathbb Q)$ is a lattice in the adeles) has Tamagawa measure 1:
$$\tau(SL_2(\mathbb Q)\setminus SL_2(A_{\mathbb Q}))=1.$$

To determine a Tamagawa measure, the group $SL_2$ consists of matrices
$$\begin{bmatrix}x&y\\z&t\end{bmatrix}$$
with $xt-yz=1$. An invariant volume form on the group is
$$\omega = \frac1x dx\wedge dy\wedge dz.$$

The measure of the quotient is the product of the measures of $SL_2(\mathbb Z)\setminus SL_2(\mathbb R)$ corresponding to the infinite place, and the measures of $SL_2(\mathbb Z_p)$ in each finite place, where $\mathbb Z_p$ is the p-adic integers.

For the local factors,
$$\omega(SL_2(\mathbb Z_p)) = |SL_2(F_p)|\omega(SL_2(\mathbb Z_p,p))$$
where $F_p$ is the field with $p$ elements, and $SL_2(\mathbb Z_p,p)$ is the congruence subgroup modulo $p$. Since each of the coordinates $x,y,z$ map the latter group onto $p\mathbb Z_p$ and $\left|\frac1x\right|_p=1$, the measure of $SL_2(\mathbb Z_p,p)$ is $\mu_p(p\mathbb Z_p)^3=p^{-3}$, where $\mu_p$ is the normalized Haar measure on $\mathbb Z_p$. Also, a standard computation shows that $|SL_2(F_p)|=p(p^2-1)$. Putting these together gives $\omega(SL_2(\mathbb Z_p))=(1-1/p^2)$.

At the infinite place, an integral computation over the fundamental domain of $SL_2(\mathbb Z)$ shows that $\omega(SL_2(\mathbb Z)\setminus SL_2(\mathbb R))=\pi^2/6$, and therefore the Weil conjecture finally gives
$$1 = \frac{\pi^2}6\prod_p \left(1-\frac1{p^2}\right).$$
On the right-hand side, we recognize the Euler product for $1/\zeta(2)$, and so this gives the solution to the Basel problem.

This approach shows the connection between (hyperbolic) geometry and arithmetic, and can be inverted to give a proof of the Weil conjecture for the special case of $SL_2$, contingent on an independent proof that $\zeta(2)=\pi^2/6$.

== Geometric proof ==
The Basel problem can be proved with Euclidean geometry, using the insight that the real line can be seen as a circle of infinite radius. An intuitive, if not completely rigorous, sketch is given here.

- Choose an integer $N$, and take $N$ equally spaced points on a circle with circumference equal to $2N$. The radius of the circle is $N/\pi$ and the length of each arc between two points is $2$. Call the points $P_{1..N}$.
- Take another generic point $Q$ on the circle, which will lie at a fraction $0 < \alpha < 1$ of the arc between two consecutive points (say $P_1$ and $P_2$ without loss of generality).
- Draw all the chords joining $Q$ with each of the $P_{1..N}$ points. Now (this is the key to the proof), compute the sum of the inverse squares of the lengths of all these chords, call it $sisc$.
- The proof relies on the notable fact that (for a fixed $\alpha$), the $sisc$ does not depend on $N$. Note that intuitively, as $N$ increases, the number of chords increases, but their length increases too (as the circle gets bigger), so their inverse square decreases.
- In particular, take the case where $\alpha = 1/2$, meaning that $Q$ is the midpoint of the arc between two consecutive $P$'s. The $sisc$ can then be found trivially from the case $N=1$, where there is only one $P$, and one $Q$ on the opposite side of the circle. Then the chord is the diameter of the circle, of length $2/\pi$. The $sisc$ is then $\pi^2/4$.
- When $N$ goes to infinity, the circle approaches the real line. If you set the origin at $Q$, the points $P_{1..N}$ are positioned at the odd integer positions (positive and negative), since the arcs have length 1 from $Q$ to $P_1$, and 2 onward. You hence get this variation of the Basel Problem:

$$\sum_{z=-\infty}^{\infty} \frac{1}{(2z-1)^2} = \frac{\pi^2}{4}$$

- From here, you can recover the original formulation with a bit of algebra, as:

$$\sum_{n=1}^\infty \frac{1}{n^2} = \sum_{n=1}^\infty \frac{1}{(2n-1)^2} + \sum_{n=1}^\infty \frac{1}{(2n)^2} = \frac{1}{2}\sum_{z=-\infty}^{\infty} \frac{1}{(2z-1)^2} + \frac{1}{4}\sum_{n=1}^\infty \frac{1}{n^2}$$

that is,

$$\frac{3}{4}\sum_{n=1}^\infty \frac{1}{n^2} = \frac{\pi^2}{8}$$

or

$$\sum_{n=1}^\infty \frac{1}{n^2} = \frac{\pi^2}{6}$$.

The independence of the $sisc$ from $N$ can be proved easily with Euclidean geometry for the more restrictive case where $N$ is a power of 2, i.e. $N = 2^n$, which still allows the limiting argument to be applied. The proof proceeds by induction on $n$, and uses the Inverse Pythagorean Theorem, which states that:

$$\frac{1}{a^2} + \frac{1}{b^2} = \frac{1}{h^2}$$

where $a$ and $b$ are the legs and $h$ is the height of a right triangle.

- In the base case of $n=0$, there is only 1 chord. In the case of $\alpha = 1/2$, it corresponds to the diameter and the $sisc$ is $\pi^2/4$ as stated above.
- Now, assume that you have $2^n$ points on a circle with radius $2^n/\pi$ and center $O$, and $2^{n+1}$ points on a circle with radius $2^{n+1}/\pi$ and center $R$. The induction step consists in showing that these 2 circles have the same $sisc$ for a given $\alpha$.
- Start by drawing the circles so that they share point $Q$. Note that $R$ lies on the smaller circle. Then, note that $2^{n+1}$ is always even, and a simple geometric argument shows that you can pick pairs of opposite points $P_1$ and $P_2$ on the larger circle by joining each pair with a diameter. Furthermore, for each pair, one of the points will be in the "lower" half of the circle (closer to $Q$) and the other in the "upper" half.

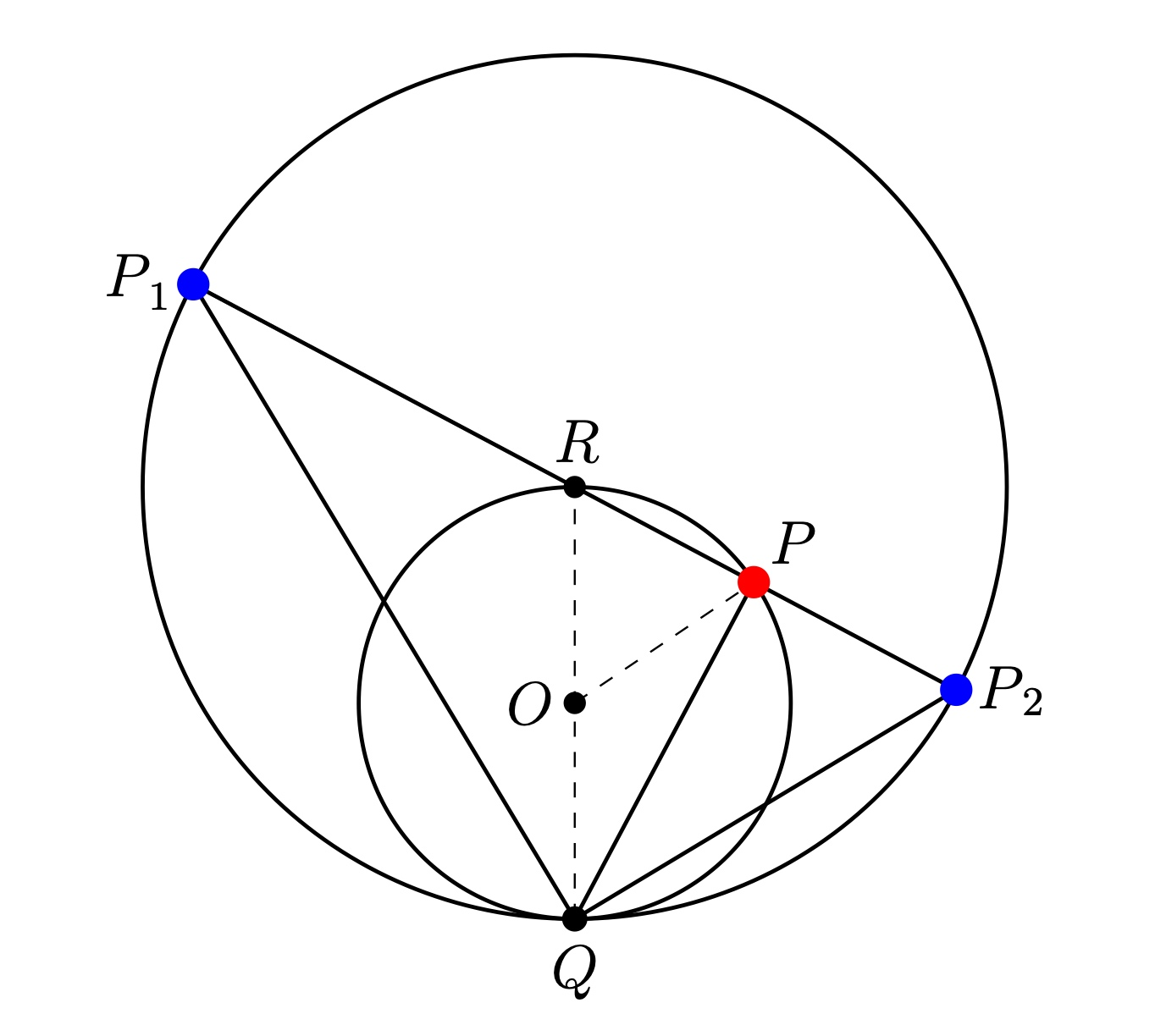
The sum of inverse squares of distances of P1 and P2 from Q equals the inverse square distance from P to Q.

- The diameter of the bigger circle $P_1P_2$ cuts the smaller circle at $R$ and at another point $P$. You can then make the following considerations:
  - $P_1 \widehat{Q} P_2$ is a right angle, since $P_1P_2$ is a diameter.
  - $Q \widehat{P} R$ is a right angle, since $QR$ is a diameter.
  - $Q \widehat{R} P_2 = Q \widehat{R} P$ is half of $Q \widehat{O} P$ for the Inscribed Angle Theorem.
  - Hence, the arc $QP$ is equal to the arc $QP_2$, again because the radius is half.
  - The chord $QP$ is the height of the right triangle $QP_1P_2$, hence for the Inverse Pythagorean Theorem:

$$\frac{1}{\overline{QP}^2} = \frac{1}{\overline{QP_1}^2} + \frac{1}{\overline{QP_2}^2}$$

- Hence for half of the points on the bigger circle (the ones in the lower half) there is a corresponding point on the smaller circle with the same arc distance from $Q$ (since the circumference of the smaller circle is half that of the bigger circle, the last two points closer to $R$ must have arc distance 2 as well). Vice versa, for each of the $2^n$ points on the smaller circle, we can build a pair of points on the bigger circle, and all of these points are equidistant and have the same arc distance from $Q$.
- Furthermore, the total $sisc$ for the bigger circle is the same as the $sisc$ for the smaller circle, since each pair of points on the bigger circle has the same inverse square sum as the corresponding point on the smaller circle.

== Other identities ==
See the special cases of the identities for the Riemann zeta function when $s = 2.$ Other notably special identities and representations of this constant appear in the sections below.

=== Series representations ===
The following are series representations of the constant:
$$\begin{align}
\zeta(2) &= 3 \sum_{k=1}^\infty \frac{1}{k^2 \binom{2k}{k}} \\[6pt]
&= \sum_{i=1}^\infty \sum_{j=1}^\infty \frac{(i-1)! (j-1)!}{(i+j)!}.
\end{align}$$

There are also BBP-type series expansions for ζ(2).

=== Integral representations ===
The following are integral representations of $\zeta(2)\text{:}$
$$\begin{align}
\zeta(2) & = -\int_0^1 \frac{\log x}{1-x} \, dx \\[6pt]
& = \int_0^{\infty} \frac{x}{e^x-1} \, dx \\[6pt]
& = \int_0^1 \frac{(\log x)^2}{(1+x)^2} \, dx \\[6pt]
& = 2 + 2\int_1^{\infty} \frac{\lfloor x \rfloor -x}{x^3} \, dx \\[6pt]
& = \exp\left(2 \int_2^{\infty} \frac{\pi(x)}{x(x^2-1)} \,dx\right) \\[6pt]
& = \int_0^1 \int_0^1 \frac{dx \, dy}{1-xy} \\[6pt]
& = \frac{4}{3} \int_0^1 \int_0^1 \frac{dx \, dy}{1-(xy)^2} \\[6pt]
& = \int_0^1 \int_0^1 \frac{1-x}{1-xy} \, dx \, dy + \frac{2}{3}.
\end{align}$$

=== Continued fractions ===
In van der Poorten's classic article chronicling Apéry's proof of the irrationality of $\zeta(3)$, the author notes as "a red herring" the similarity of a simple continued fraction for Apery's constant, and the following one for the Basel constant:
$$\frac{\zeta(2)}{5} = \cfrac{1}{\widetilde{v}_1 + \cfrac{1^4}{\widetilde{v}_2+\cfrac{2^4}{\widetilde{v}_3+\cfrac{3^4}{\widetilde{v}_4+\ddots}}}},$$
where $\widetilde{v}_n = 11n^2-11n+3 \mapsto \{3,25,69,135,\ldots\}$. Another continued fraction of a similar form is:
$$\frac{\zeta(2)}{2} = \cfrac{1}{v_1 + \cfrac{1^4}{v_2+\cfrac{2^4}{v_3+\cfrac{3^4}{v_4+\ddots}}}},$$
where $v_n = 2n-1 \mapsto \{1,3,5,7,9,\ldots\}$.

== See also ==
- List of sums of reciprocals
