= Particular values of the Riemann zeta function =

Constants of the mathematical zeta function

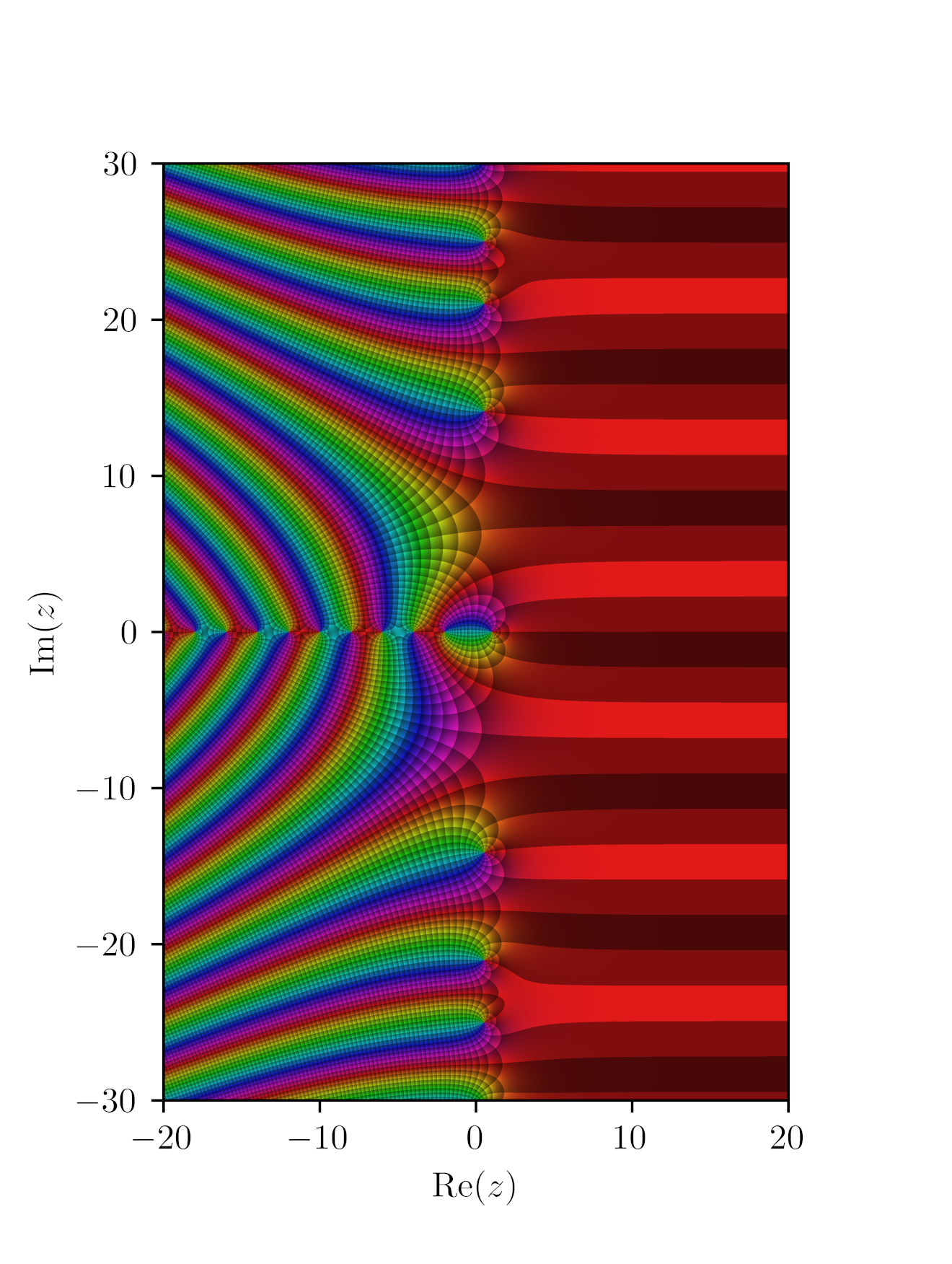
The Riemann zeta function plotted on the complex plane using domain coloring.

In mathematics, the Riemann zeta function is a function in complex analysis, which is also important in number theory. It is often denoted $\zeta(s)$ and is named after the mathematician Bernhard Riemann. When the argument $s$ is a real number greater than one, the zeta function satisfies the equation
$$\zeta(s) = \sum_{n=1}^\infty\frac{1}{n^s} \, .$$
It can therefore provide the sum of various convergent infinite series, such as $\zeta(2) = \frac{1}{1^2} +$$\frac{1}{2^2} +$$\frac{1}{3^2} + \ldots \, .$ Explicit or numerically efficient formulae exist for $\zeta(s)$ at integer arguments, all of which have real values, including this example. This article lists these formulae, together with tables of values. It also includes derivatives and some series composed of the zeta function at integer arguments.

The same equation in $s$ above also holds when $s$ is a complex number whose real part is greater than one, ensuring that the infinite sum still converges. The zeta function can then be extended to the whole of the complex plane by analytic continuation, except for a simple pole at $s=1$. The complex derivative exists in this more general region, making the zeta function a meromorphic function. The above equation no longer applies for these extended values of $s$, for which the corresponding summation would diverge. For example, the full zeta function exists at $s=-1$ (and is therefore finite there), but the corresponding series would be $1 + 2 + 3 + \ldots$, whose partial sums would grow indefinitely large.

The zeta function values listed below include function values at the negative even numbers ($s=-2,-4$, etc.), for which $\zeta(s)=0$ and which make up the so-called trivial zeros. The Riemann zeta function article includes a colour plot illustrating how the function varies over a continuous rectangular region of the complex plane. The successful characterisation of its non-trivial zeros in the wider plane is important in number theory, because of the Riemann hypothesis.

== The Riemann zeta function at 0 and 1 ==
At zero, one has
$$\zeta(0)= {B^-_1}=-{B^+_1}=-\tfrac{1}{2}\!$$

At 1 there is a pole, so $\zeta(1)$ is not finite but the left and right limits are:
$$\lim_{\varepsilon\to 0^\pm}\zeta(1+\varepsilon) = \pm\infty$$
Since it is a pole of first order, it has a complex residue
$$\lim_{\varepsilon\to 0} \varepsilon \zeta(1+\varepsilon) = 1\,.$$

== Positive integers ==
=== Even positive integers ===
For the even positive integers $n$, one has the relationship to the Bernoulli numbers $B_n$:
$$\zeta(n) = (-1)^{\tfrac{n}{2}+1}\frac{(2\pi)^{n}B_n}{2(n!)} \,.$$

The computation of $\zeta(2)$ is known as the Basel problem. The value of $\zeta(4)$ is related to the Stefan–Boltzmann law and Wien approximation in physics. The first few values are given by:
$$\begin{align}
\zeta(2) & = 1 + \frac{1}{2^2} + \frac{1}{3^2} + \cdots = \frac{\pi^2}{6} \\[4pt]
\zeta(4) & = 1 + \frac{1}{2^4} + \frac{1}{3^4} + \cdots = \frac{\pi^4}{90} \\[4pt]
\zeta(6) & = 1 + \frac{1}{2^6} + \frac{1}{3^6} + \cdots = \frac{\pi^6}{945} \\[4pt]
\zeta(8) & = 1 + \frac{1}{2^8} + \frac{1}{3^8} + \cdots = \frac{\pi^8}{9450} \\[4pt]
\zeta(10) & = 1 + \frac{1}{2^{10}} + \frac{1}{3^{10}} + \cdots = \frac{\pi^{10}}{93555} \\[4pt]
\zeta(12) & = 1 + \frac{1}{2^{12}} + \frac{1}{3^{12}} + \cdots = \frac{691\pi^{12}}{638512875} \\[4pt]
\zeta(14) & = 1 + \frac{1}{2^{14}} + \frac{1}{3^{14}} + \cdots = \frac{2\pi^{14}}{18243225} \\[4pt]
\zeta(16) & = 1 + \frac{1}{2^{16}} + \frac{1}{3^{16}} + \cdots = \frac{3617\pi^{16}}{325641566250}\,.
\end{align}$$

Taking the limit $n \rightarrow \infty$, one obtains $\zeta (\infty) = 1$.

Selected values for even integers
Value	Decimal expansion	Source
$\zeta(2)$	1.6449340668482264364...	OEIS: A013661
$\zeta(4)$	1.0823232337111381915...	OEIS: A013662
$\zeta(6)$	1.0173430619844491397...	OEIS: A013664
$\zeta(8)$	1.0040773561979443393...	OEIS: A013666
$\zeta(10)$	1.0009945751278180853...	OEIS: A013668
$\zeta(12)$	1.0002460865533080482...	OEIS: A013670
$\zeta(14)$	1.0000612481350587048...	OEIS: A013672
$\zeta(16)$	1.0000152822594086518...	OEIS: A013674

The relationship between zeta at the positive even integers and powers of pi may be written as

$$a_n \zeta(2n) = \pi^{2n} b_n$$

where $a_n$ and $b_n$ are coprime positive integers for all $n$. These are given by the integer sequences OEIS: A002432 and OEIS: A046988, respectively, in OEIS. Some of these values are reproduced below:

coefficients
n	a_{n}	b_{n}
1	6	1
2	90	1
3	945	1
4	9450	1
5	93555	1
6	638512875	691
7	18243225	2
8	325641566250	3617
9	38979295480125	43867
10	1531329465290625	174611
11	13447856940643125	155366
12	201919571963756521875	236364091
13	11094481976030578125	1315862
14	564653660170076273671875	6785560294
15	5660878804669082674070015625	6892673020804
16	62490220571022341207266406250	7709321041217
17	12130454581433748587292890625	151628697551

If we let $\eta_n=b_n/a_n$ be the coefficient of $\pi^{2n}$ as above,
$$\zeta(2n) = \sum_{\ell=1}^{\infty}\frac{1}{\ell^{2n}}=\eta_n\pi^{2n}$$
then we find recursively,

$$\begin{align}
\eta_1 &= 1/6 \\
\eta_n &= \sum_{\ell=1}^{n-1}(-1)^{\ell-1}\frac{\eta_{n-\ell}}{(2\ell+1)!}+(-1)^{n+1}\frac{n}{(2n+1)!}
\end{align}$$

This recurrence relation may be derived from that for the Bernoulli numbers.

Also, there is another recurrence:

$$\zeta(2n)=\frac{1}{n+\frac{1}{2}} \sum_{k=1}^{n-1} \zeta(2k)\zeta(2n-2k) \quad \text{ for } \quad n>1$$
which can be proved, using that $\frac{d}{dx} \cot(x) = -1-\cot^{2} (x)$

The values of the zeta function at non-negative even integers have the generating function:
$$\sum_{n=0}^\infty \zeta(2n) x^{2n} = -\frac{\pi x}{2} \cot(\pi x) = -\frac{1}{2} + \frac{\pi^2}{6} x^2 + \frac{\pi^4}{90} x^4+\frac{\pi^6}{945}x^6 + \cdots$$
Since
$$\lim_{n\rightarrow\infty} \zeta(2n)=1$$
The formula also shows that for $n\in\mathbb{N}, n\rightarrow\infty$,
$$\left|B_{2n}\right| \sim \frac{(2n)!\,2}{\;~(2\pi)^{2n}\,}$$

=== Odd positive integers ===
The sum of the harmonic series is infinite.
$$\zeta(1) = 1 + \frac{1}{2} + \frac{1}{3} + \cdots = \infty\!$$

The value $\zeta(3)$ is also known as Apéry's constant and has a role in the electron's gyromagnetic ratio. The value $\zeta(3)$ also appears in Planck's law. These and additional values are:

Selected values for odd integers
Value	Decimal expansion	Source
$\zeta(3)$	1.2020569031595942853...	OEIS: A002117
$\zeta(5)$	1.0369277551433699263...	OEIS: A013663
$\zeta(7)$	1.0083492773819228268...	OEIS: A013665
$\zeta(9)$	1.0020083928260822144...	OEIS: A013667
$\zeta(11)$	1.0004941886041194645...	OEIS: A013669
$\zeta(13)$	1.0001227133475784891...	OEIS: A013671
$\zeta(15)$	1.0000305882363070204...	OEIS: A013673

It is known that $\zeta(3)$ is irrational (Apéry's theorem) and that infinitely many of the numbers $\zeta(2n+1):n\in\mathbb N$, are irrational. There are also results on the irrationality of values of the Riemann zeta function at the elements of certain subsets of the positive odd integers; for example, at least one of $\zeta(5), \zeta(7), \zeta(9),$ or $\zeta(11)$ is irrational.

The positive odd integers of the zeta function appear in physics, specifically correlation functions of antiferromagnetic XXX spin chain.

Most of the identities following below are provided by Simon Plouffe. They are notable in that they converge quite rapidly, giving almost three digits of precision per iteration, and are thus useful for high-precision calculations.

Plouffe stated the following identities without proof. Proofs were later given by other authors.

==== ζ(5) ====
$$\begin{align}
\zeta(5)&=\frac{1}{294}\pi^5 -\frac{72}{35} \sum_{n=1}^\infty \frac{1}{n^5 (e^{2\pi n} -1)}-\frac{2}{35} \sum_{n=1}^\infty \frac{1}{n^5 (e^{2\pi n} +1)}\\
\zeta(5)&=12 \sum_{n=1}^\infty \frac{1}{n^5 \sinh (\pi n)} -\frac{39}{20} \sum_{n=1}^\infty \frac{1}{n^5 (e^{2\pi n} -1)}+\frac{1}{20} \sum_{n=1}^\infty \frac{1}{n^5 (e^{2\pi n} +1)}
\end{align}$$

Recently, several other versions have been published:
$$\begin{align}
\zeta(5)&=\frac{\pi^5}{270}-\frac{32}{15}\sum_{n=1}^\infin\frac{1}{n^5(e^{\pi n}+(-1)^n)}
\end{align}$$

A 2026 preprint by Aabir Fauzan contains a claimed proof of the irrationality of $\zeta(5)$, and a subsequent formalization was claimed in Lean.

==== ζ(7) ====
$$\zeta(7)=\frac{19}{56700}\pi^7 - 2 \sum_{n=1}^\infty \frac{1}{n^7 (e^{2\pi n} -1)}\!$$

Note that the sum is in the form of a Lambert series.

==== ζ(2n + 1) ====
By defining the quantities
$$S_\pm(s) = \sum_{n=1}^\infty \frac{1}{n^s (e^{2\pi n} \pm 1)}$$
a series of relationships can be given in the form
$$0=a_n \zeta(n) - b_n \pi^{n} + c_n S_-(n) + d_n S_+(n)$$
where $a_n, b_n, c_n$ and $d_n$ are positive integers. Plouffe gives a table of values:

coefficients
n	a_{n} (OEIS: A395662)	b_{n} (OEIS: A395663)	c_{n} (OEIS: A396050)	d_{n} (OEIS: A395748)
3	180	7	360	0
5	1470	5	3024	84
7	56700	19	113400	0
9	18523890	625	37122624	74844
11	425675250	1453	851350500	0
13	257432175	89	514926720	62370
15	390769879500	13687	781539759000	0
17	1904417007743250	6758333	3808863131673600	29116187100
19	21438612514068750	7708537	42877225028137500	0
21	1881063815762259253125	68529640373	3762129424572110592000	1793047592085750

These integer constants may be expressed as sums over Bernoulli numbers, as given in (Vepstas, 2006) below.

A fast algorithm for the calculation of Riemann's zeta function for any integer argument is given by E. A. Karatsuba.

== Negative integers ==
In general, for negative integers, one has
$$\zeta(-n)= - \frac{B_{n+1}}{n+1}$$

The so-called "trivial zeros" occur at the negative even integers:
$$\zeta(-2n)=0$$
(Ramanujan summation)

The first few values for negative odd integers are
$$\begin{align}
\zeta(-1) &=-\frac{1}{12} \\[4pt]
\zeta(-3) &=\frac{1}{120} \\[4pt]
\zeta(-5) &=-\frac{1}{252} \\[4pt]
\zeta(-7) &=\frac{1}{240} \\[4pt]
\zeta(-9) &= -\frac{1}{132} \\[4pt]
\zeta(-11)&= \frac{691}{32760} \\[4pt]
\zeta(-13)&= -\frac{1}{12}
\end{align}$$

This means $\zeta(m)$ can be used as the definition of Bernoulli numbers.

However, just like the Bernoulli numbers, these do not stay small for increasingly negative odd values. For details on $\zeta(-1)$, see 1 + 2 + 3 + 4 + ⋯.

== Derivatives ==
The derivative of the zeta function at the negative even integers is given by
$$\zeta^{\prime}(-2n) = (-1)^n \frac {(2n)!} {2 (2\pi)^{2n}} \zeta (2n+1)\,.$$

The first few values of which are
$$\begin{align}
\zeta^{\prime}(-2) & = -\frac{\zeta(3)}{4\pi^2} \\[4pt]
\zeta^{\prime}(-4) & = \frac{3}{4\pi^4} \zeta(5) \\[4pt]
\zeta^{\prime}(-6) & = -\frac{45}{8\pi^6} \zeta(7) \\[4pt]
\zeta^{\prime}(-8) & = \frac{315}{4\pi^8} \zeta(9)\,.
\end{align}$$

One also has
$$\begin{align}
\zeta^{\prime}(0) & = -\frac{1}{2}\ln(2\pi) \\[4pt]
\zeta^{\prime}(-1) & = \frac{1}{12}-\ln A \\[4pt]
\zeta^{\prime}(2) & = \frac{1}{6}\pi^2(\gamma +\ln 2-12\ln A+\ln \pi)
\end{align}$$
where $A$ is the Glaisher–Kinkelin constant. The first of these identities implies that the regularized product of the reciprocals of the positive integers is $1/\sqrt{2\pi}$, thus the amusing "equation" $\infty!=\sqrt{2\pi}$.

From the logarithmic derivative of the functional equation,
$$2\frac{\zeta'(1/2)}{\zeta(1/2)} = \log(2\pi)+\frac{\pi\cos(\pi/4)}{2\sin(\pi/4)}-\frac{\Gamma'(1/2)}{\Gamma(1/2)}=\log(2\pi)+\frac{\pi}{2}+2\log 2+\gamma\,.$$

Selected derivatives
Value	Decimal expansion	Source
$\zeta'(3)$	−0.19812624288563685333...	OEIS: A244115
$\zeta'(2)$	−0.93754825431584375370...	OEIS: A073002
$\zeta'(0)$	−0.91893853320467274178...	OEIS: A075700
$\zeta'(-\tfrac{1}{2})$	−0.36085433959994760734...	OEIS: A271854
$\zeta'(-1)$	−0.16542114370045092921...	OEIS: A084448
$\zeta'(-2)$	−0.030448457058393270780...	OEIS: A240966
$\zeta'(-3)$	+0.0053785763577743011444...	OEIS: A259068
$\zeta'(-4)$	+0.0079838114502686242806...	OEIS: A259069
$\zeta'(-5)$	−0.00057298598019863520499...	OEIS: A259070
$\zeta'(-6)$	−0.0058997591435159374506...	OEIS: A259071
$\zeta'(-7)$	−0.00072864268015924065246...	OEIS: A259072
$\zeta'(-8)$	+0.0083161619856022473595...	OEIS: A259073

== Series involving ζ(n) ==
The following sums can be derived from the generating function:
$$\sum_{k=2}^\infty \zeta(k) x^{k-1}=-\psi_0(1-x)-\gamma$$
where $\psi_0$ is the digamma function.
$$\begin{align}
\sum_{k=2}^\infty (\zeta(k) -1) & = 1 \\[4pt]
\sum_{k=1}^\infty (\zeta(2k) -1) & = \frac{3}{4} \\[4pt]
\sum_{k=1}^\infty (\zeta(2k+1) -1) & = \frac{1}{4} \\[4pt]
\sum_{k=2}^\infty (-1)^k(\zeta(k) -1) & = \frac{1}{2}
\end{align}$$

Series related to the Euler–Mascheroni constant (denoted by $\gamma$) are
$$\begin{align}
\sum_{k=2}^\infty (-1)^k \frac{\zeta(k)}{k} & = \gamma \\[4pt]
\sum_{k=2}^\infty \frac{\zeta(k) - 1}{k} & = 1 - \gamma \\[4pt]
\sum_{k=2}^\infty (-1)^k \frac{\zeta(k)-1}{k} & = \ln2 + \gamma - 1
\end{align}$$
and using the principal value
$$\zeta(k) = \lim_{\varepsilon \to 0} \frac{\zeta(k+\varepsilon)+\zeta(k-\varepsilon)}{2}$$
which of course affects only the value at 1, these formulae can be stated as
$$\begin{align}
\sum_{k=1}^\infty (-1)^k \frac{\zeta(k)}{k} & = 0 \\[4pt]
\sum_{k=1}^\infty \frac{\zeta(k) - 1}{k} & = 0 \\[4pt]
\sum_{k=1}^\infty (-1)^k \frac{\zeta(k)-1}{k} & = \ln2
\end{align}$$
and show that they depend on the principal value of $\zeta(1)=\gamma$.

== Nontrivial zeros ==
Zeros of the Riemann zeta except negative even integers are called "nontrivial zeros". The Riemann hypothesis states that the real part of every nontrivial zero must be 1/2. In other words, all known nontrivial zeros of the Riemann zeta are of the form $z=\tfrac12+yi$ where $y$ is a real number. The following table contains the decimal expansion of $\mathrm{Im}(z)$ for the first few nontrivial zeros:

Selected nontrivial zeros
Decimal expansion of Im(z)	Source
14.134725141734693790...	OEIS: A058303
21.022039638771554992...	OEIS: A065434
25.010857580145688763...	OEIS: A065452
30.424876125859513210...	OEIS: A065453
32.935061587739189690...	OEIS: A192492
37.586178158825671257...	OEIS: A305741
40.918719012147495187...	OEIS: A305742
43.327073280914999519...	OEIS: A305743
48.005150881167159727...	OEIS: A305744
49.773832477672302181...	OEIS: A306004

Andrew Odlyzko computed the first 2 million nontrivial zeros accurate to within $4\times10^{-9}$, and the first 100 zeros accurate within 1000 decimal places. See their website for the tables and bibliographies. A table of about 103 billion zeros with high precision (within $2^{-102}\approx2\cdot10^{-31}$) is available for interactive access and download in a compressed format via LMFDB.

== Ratios ==
Although evaluating particular values of the zeta function is difficult, often certain ratios can be found by inserting particular values of the gamma function into the functional equation
$$\zeta(s) = 2^s\pi^{s-1}\sin\left(\frac{\pi s}{2}\right)\Gamma(1-s)\zeta(1-s)$$

We have simple relations for half-integer arguments
$$\begin{align}
\frac{\zeta(3/2)}{\zeta(-1/2)} &= -4\pi \\
\frac{\zeta(5/2)}{\zeta(-3/2)} &= -\frac{16\pi^2}{3} \\
\frac{\zeta(7/2)}{\zeta(-5/2)} &= \frac{64\pi^3}{15} \\
\frac{\zeta(9/2)}{\zeta(-7/2)} &= \frac{256\pi^4}{105}
\end{align}$$

Other examples follow for more complicated evaluations and relations of the gamma function. For example a consequence of the relation
$$\Gamma\left(\tfrac{3}{4}\right) =\left(\tfrac{\pi} {2}\right) ^{\tfrac{1}{4}} {\operatorname{AGM}\left(\sqrt 2, 1\right)}^{\tfrac{1}{2}}$$
is the zeta ratio relation
$$\frac{\zeta(3/4)}{\zeta(1/4)} = 2\sqrt{\frac{\pi}{(2-\sqrt{2})\operatorname{AGM}\left(\sqrt 2, 1\right)}}$$
where AGM is the arithmetic–geometric mean. In a similar vein, it is possible to form radical relations, such as from
$$\frac{\Gamma\left(\frac{1}{5}\right)^2}{\Gamma\left(\frac{1}{10}\right)\Gamma\left(\frac{3}{10}\right)} = \frac{\sqrt{1+\sqrt{5}}}{2^{\tfrac{7}{10}}\sqrt[4]{5}}$$
the analogous zeta relation is
$$\frac{\zeta(1/5)^2\zeta(7/10)\zeta(9/10)}{\zeta(1/10)\zeta(3/10)\zeta(4/5)^2} = \frac{(5-\sqrt{5})\left(\sqrt{10}+\sqrt{5+\sqrt{5}}\right)}{10\cdot2^{\tfrac{3}{10}}}$$
