= Frits Beukers =

Dutch mathematician (born 1953)

Frits Beukers (Dutch pronunciation: [frɪts ˈbøːkərs]; born 1953 in Ankara, Turkey) is a Dutch mathematician, who works on number theory and hypergeometric functions.

In 1979 Beukers received his PhD at Leiden University under the direction of Robert Tijdeman with thesis The generalized Ramanujan–Nagell Equation, published in Acta Arithmetica, vol. 38, 1980/1981. From 1979 to 1980 he was a visiting scholar at the Institute for Advanced Study. He became a professor in Leiden and in the 2000s at Utrecht University.

Beukers works on questions of transcendence and irrationality in number theory, and on other topics. In connection with the famous proof by Roger Apéry (1978) on the irrationality of the values of the Riemann zeta function evaluated at the points 2 and 3, Beukers gave a much simpler alternate proof using Legendre polynomials. He also published on questions in mechanics about dynamical systems and their exact solvability.

== Selected works ==
- Beukers, Frits (1992). "Differential Galois Theory". From Number Theory to Physics. Berlin, Heidelberg: Springer Berlin Heidelberg. pp. 413–439. doi:10.1007/978-3-662-02838-4_8. ISBN 978-3-642-08097-5. S2CID 123608326.
- Beukers, F. (1999). Getaltheorie voor beginners (in Dutch). Utrecht: Epsilon Uitgaven. ISBN 90-5041-049-9. OCLC 67951885.
- A rational approach to Pi, Nieuw Archief voor Wiskunde, 2000, Heft 4
- Beukers, F. (1979). "A Note on the Irrationality of ζ(2) and ζ(3)". Bulletin of the London Mathematical Society. 11 (3). Wiley: 268–272. doi:10.1112/blms/11.3.268. ISSN 0024-6093.
