= Swiss Journal of Economics and Statistics =

Academic journal

- Discipline: Economics, statistics
- Language: English
- Edited by: Marius Brülhart

Publication details
- Former names: Schweizerische Zeitschrift für Volkswirtschaft und Statistik; Zeitschrift für Schweizerische Statistik; Journal de Statistique et Revue économique Suisse
- History: 1864–present
- Publisher: SpringerOpen on behalf of the Swiss Society of Economics and Statistics
- Frequency: Continuously
- Open access: Yes
- License: Creative Commons Attribution

Standard abbreviations
- ISO 4: Swiss J. Econ. Stat.

Indexing
- ISSN: 0303-9692 (print); 2235-6282 (web)
- LCCN: 2019207626
- OCLC no.: 621251978

Links
- Journal homepage; Online archive

The Swiss Journal of Economics and Statistics is an open access peer-reviewed academic journal of economics, published by SpringerOpen on behalf of the Swiss Society of Economics and Statistics, and financially supported by the Swiss Academy of Humanities and Social Sciences and the Swiss National Bank. The current editor-in-chief is Marius Brülhart.

== History ==
The journal was established in 1864 as the Zeitschrift für Schweizerische Statistik (in German) and Journal de Statistique suisse (in French). Its first editor was Johannes Stössel, the secretary of the Federal Statistical Bureau , who served as an editor from 1864 to 1869.

In 1916, the journal was titled Zeitschrift für schweizerische Statistik und Volkswirtschaft (in German) and Journal de statistique et Revue économique suisse (in French), and from 1945 onwards, it was named Schweizerische Zeitschrift für Volkswirtschaft und Statistik (in German), Revue suisse d'Économie politique et de Statistique (in French), and Swiss Journal of Economics and Statistics (in English).

Although the journal is now published entirely in English, issues prior to the first edition of 2007 also accepted articles written in German, French and Italian.

== Abstracting and indexing ==
The journal is abstracted and indexed in:

- Directory of Open Access Journals
- EBSCO databases
- EconLit
- Mir@bel
- ProQuest databases
- Scopus

== Editors-in-chief ==
- 1864—1869: Johannes Stössel, Federal Statistics Bureau
- 1870: Armand Châtelanat, Federal Statistics Bureau
- 1871—1874: Wilhelm Gisi, University of Bern
- 1875—1880: Armand Châtelanat, Federal Statistics Bureau
- 1880—1886: Joseph Durrer, Federal Statistics Bureau
- 1880—1886: Johann Jakob Kummer, Federal Statistics Bureau and Federal Social Insurance Office
- 1880—1889: Edmund Wilhelm Milliet, Federal Statistics Bureau
- 1889—1913: Louis Guillaume, Federal Statistics Bureau
- 1914—1925: Julius Landmann, University of Basel
- 1926—1943: Fritz Mangold, University of Basel
- 1944—1959: Valentin Fritz Wagner, University of Basel
- 1959—1966: Jürg Niehans, University of Zurich
- 1967—1973: Paul Stocker, University of Bern
- 1967—1984: Hermann Gottlieb Bieri, University of Bern
- 1985—1996: Ernst Baltensperger, University of Bern
- 1997—2003: Peter Kugler, University of Basel
- 2004—2014: Klaus Neusser, University of Bern
- 2015—2021: Rafael Lalive, University of Lausanne
- 2022: Sarah M. Lein, University of Basel
- 2023—present: Marius Brülhart, University of Lausanne

== Notable papers ==
Selected papers highlighted for their historical significance (older papers) or GoogleScholar citation impact (most recent papers).

- Jannasch, Robert (1868). "Die Statistik als wissenschaftliche Methodik und Zustandsdynamik" ["Statistics as a scientific methodology and state dynamics"] (PDF). Swiss J. Econ. Stat. (in German). VII (4) – via SSES Archives.
- Röthlisberger, Ernst (1989). "Die geistige Produktion der Schweiz" [The Intellectual Production of Switzerland] (PDF). Swiss J. Econ. Stat. (in German). I (22) – via SSES Archives.
- Pareto, Vilfredo (1899). "Tables pour faciliter l'application de la méthodes des moindres carrés" [Tables to facilitate the application of the method of least squares] (PDF). Swiss J. Econ. Stat. (in French). I (20): 121–150 – via SSES Archives.
- Pareto, Vilfredo (1899). "Rapport Sur Les Bases de l'assurance de La Fraternité, Société de Secours En Cas de Décès, à Lausanne" [Report on the Bases of Insurance for La Fraternité, a Society for Mutual Aid in Case of Death, in Lausanne] (PDF). Swiss J. Econ. Stat. (in French). I (17): 104–115 – via SSES Archives.
- Brunner, Karl (1958). "A Case Study of US Monetary Policy: Reserve Requirements and Inflationary Gold Flows in the Middle 30's" (PDF). Swiss J. Econ. Stat. II (4): 160–201 – via SSES Archives.
- Niehans, Jürg (1959). "Monopolpreis, vertikale Integration und Mengenrabatt" [Monopoly price, vertical integration, and quantity discount] (PDF). Swiss J. Econ. Stat. (in German). 95 (III): 328–334 – via SSES Archives.
- Weber, Max (1964). "Die soziale Schweiz" [Social Switzerland] (PDF). Swiss J. Econ. Stat. (in German). I–II (6): 167–194 – via SSES Archives.
- Jones, Ronald W. (1980). "Comparative and absolute advantage" (PDF). Swiss J. Econ. Stat. 116 (III): 235–260. S2CID 64797996 – via SSES Archives.
- Hellwig, Martin (1995). "Systemic aspects of risk management in banking and finance" (PDF). Swiss J. Econ. Stat. 131 (IV): 723–738. S2CID 167192824 – via SSES Archives.
- Gigerenzer, Gerd (1997). "Bounded rationality: Models of fast and frugal inference" (PDF). Swiss J. Econ. Stat. 133 (II): 201–218. S2CID 14235427 – via SSES Archives.
- Panizza, Ugo; Presbitero, Andrea F. (2013). "Public debt and economic growth in advanced economies: A survey". Swiss J. Econ. Stat. 149 (2): 175–204. doi:10.1007/BF03399388. hdl:10419/186022. S2CID 154891266.
- Lusardi, Annamaria (2019). "Financial literacy and the need for financial education: evidence and implications". Swiss J. Econ. Stat. 155 (1). doi:10.1186/s41937-019-0027-5. hdl:10419/259733. S2CID 169986432.
