= Particular values of the gamma function =

Mathematical constants

The gamma function is an important special function in mathematics. Its particular values can be expressed in closed form for integer, half-integer, and some other rational arguments, but no simple expressions are known for the values at rational points in general. Other fractional arguments can be approximated through efficient infinite products, infinite series, and recurrence relations.

== Integers and half-integers ==
For positive integer arguments, the gamma function coincides with the factorial. That is,

$$\Gamma(n) = (n-1)!,$$

and hence

$$\begin{align}
\Gamma(1) &= 1, \\
\Gamma(2) &= 1, \\
\Gamma(3) &= 2, \\
\Gamma(4) &= 6, \\
\Gamma(5) &= 24,
\end{align}$$

and so on. For non-positive integers, the gamma function is not defined.

For positive half-integers $\frac{k}{2}$ where $k\in 2\mathbb{N}^*+1$ is an odd integer greater than or equal to $3$, the function values are given exactly by

$$\Gamma \left (\tfrac{k}{2} \right) = \sqrt \pi \frac{(k-2)!!}{2^\frac{k-1}{2}}\,,$$

or equivalently, for non-negative integer values of n:

$$\begin{align}
\Gamma\left(\tfrac12+n\right) &= \frac{(2n-1)!!}{2^n}\, \sqrt{\pi} = \frac{(2n)!}{4^n n!} \sqrt{\pi} \\
\Gamma\left(\tfrac12-n\right) &= \frac{(-2)^n}{(2n-1)!!}\, \sqrt{\pi} = \frac{(-4)^n n!}{(2n)!} \sqrt{\pi}
\end{align}$$

where n!! denotes the double factorial. In particular,

$\Gamma\left(\tfrac12\right)\,$	$= \sqrt{\pi}\,$	$\approx 1.772\,453\,850\,905\,516\,0273\,,$	OEIS: A002161
$\Gamma\left(\tfrac32\right)\,$	$= \tfrac12 \sqrt{\pi}\,$	$\approx 0.886\,226\,925\,452\,758\,0137\,,$	OEIS: A019704
$\Gamma\left(\tfrac52\right)\,$	$= \tfrac34 \sqrt{\pi}\,$	$\approx 1.329\,340\,388\,179\,137\,0205\,,$	OEIS: A245884
$\Gamma\left(\tfrac72\right)\,$	$= \tfrac{15}8 \sqrt{\pi}\,$	$\approx 3.323\,350\,970\,447\,842\,5512\,,$	OEIS: A245885

and by means of the reflection formula,

$\Gamma\left(-\tfrac12\right)\,$	$= -2\sqrt{\pi}\,$	$\approx -3.544\,907\,701\,811\,032\,0546\,,$	OEIS: A019707
$\Gamma\left(-\tfrac32\right)\,$	$= \tfrac43 \sqrt{\pi}\,$	$\approx 2.363\,271\,801\,207\,354\,7031\,,$	OEIS: A245886
$\Gamma\left(-\tfrac52\right)\,$	$= -\tfrac 8{15} \sqrt{\pi}\,$	$\approx -0.945\,308\,720\,482\,941\,8812\,,$	OEIS: A245887

== General rational argument ==
In analogy with the half-integer formula,

$$\begin{align}
\Gamma \left(n+\tfrac13 \right) &= \Gamma \left(\tfrac13 \right) \frac{(3n-2)!!!}{3^n} \\
\Gamma \left(n+\tfrac14 \right) &= \Gamma \left(\tfrac14 \right ) \frac{(4n-3)!!!!}{4^n} \\
\Gamma \left(n+\tfrac{1}{q} \right ) &= \Gamma \left(\tfrac{1}{q} \right ) \frac{\big(qn-(q-1)\big)!^{(q)}}{q^n} \\
\Gamma \left(n+\tfrac{p}{q} \right) &= \Gamma \left(\tfrac{p}{q}\right) \frac{1}{q^n} \prod _{k=1}^n (k q+p-q)
\end{align}$$

where n!^{(q)} denotes the qth multifactorial of n. Numerically,

$\Gamma\left(\tfrac13\right) \approx 2.678\,938\,534\,707\,747\,6337$ OEIS: A073005
$\Gamma\left(\tfrac14\right) \approx 3.625\,609\,908\,221\,908\,3119$ OEIS: A068466
$\Gamma\left(\tfrac15\right) \approx 4.590\,843\,711\,998\,803\,0532$ OEIS: A175380
$\Gamma\left(\tfrac16\right) \approx 5.566\,316\,001\,780\,235\,2043$ OEIS: A175379
$\Gamma\left(\tfrac17\right) \approx 6.548\,062\,940\,247\,824\,4377$ OEIS: A220086
$\Gamma\left(\tfrac18\right) \approx 7.533\,941\,598\,797\,611\,9047$ OEIS: A203142.

Additionally,

$$\lim_{n\to\infty}\left(n-\Gamma\left(\tfrac1n\right)\right) =\gamma$$

where $\gamma$ is the Euler–Mascheroni constant.

It is unknown whether these constants are transcendental in general, but Γ(1/3) and Γ(1/4) were shown to be transcendental by G. V. Chudnovsky. Γ(1/4) / ^{4}√π has also long been known to be transcendental, and Yuri Nesterenko proved in 1996 that Γ(1/4), π, and e^{π} are algebraically independent.

For $n\geq 2$ at least one of the two numbers $\Gamma\left(\tfrac1n\right)$ and $\Gamma\left(\tfrac2n\right)$ is transcendental.

The number $\Gamma\left(\tfrac14\right)$ is related to the lemniscate constant $\varpi$ by

$$\Gamma\left(\tfrac14\right) = \sqrt{2\varpi\sqrt{2\pi}}$$

Borwein and Zucker have found that Γ(n/24) can be expressed algebraically in terms of π, K(k(1)), K(k(2)), K(k(3)) and K(k(6)) where K(k(N)) is a complete elliptic integral of the first kind. This permits efficiently approximating the gamma function of rational arguments to high precision using quadratically convergent arithmetic–geometric mean iterations. For example:

$$\begin{align}
\Gamma \left(\tfrac16 \right) &= \frac{\sqrt{\frac{3}{\pi }} \Gamma\left(\frac{1}{3}\right)^2}{\sqrt[3]{2}} \\
\Gamma \left(\tfrac14 \right) &= 2\sqrt{K\left( \tfrac{1}{\sqrt{2}} \right)\sqrt{\pi}} \\
\Gamma \left(\tfrac13 \right) &= \frac{2^{7/9} \sqrt[3]{\pi K\left(\frac{\sqrt3-1}{2\sqrt2}\right)}}{\sqrt[12]{3}} \\
\Gamma \left(\tfrac{1}{8}\right) \Gamma \left(\tfrac{3}{8}\right) &= 8 \sqrt[4]{2} \sqrt{\left(\sqrt{2}-1\right) \pi } K\left(3-2 \sqrt{2}\right) \\
\frac{\Gamma \left(\frac{1}{8}\right)}{\Gamma \left(\frac{3}{8}\right)} &= \frac{2 \sqrt{\left(1+\sqrt{2}\right) K\left(\frac{1}{2}\right)}}{\sqrt[4]{\pi }}
\end{align}$$

No similar relations are known for Γ(1/5) or other denominators.

In particular, where AGM() is the arithmetic–geometric mean, we have

$$\Gamma\left(\tfrac13\right) = \frac{2^\frac{1}{9}(2\pi)^\frac23}{3^\frac{1}{12}\cdot \operatorname{AGM}\left(2,\sqrt{2+\sqrt{3}}\right)^\frac13}$$
$$\Gamma\left(\tfrac14\right) = \sqrt \frac{(2 \pi)^\frac32}{\operatorname{AGM}\left(\sqrt 2, 1\right)}$$
$$\Gamma\left(\tfrac16\right) = \frac{2^\frac{14}{9}\cdot 3^\frac13\cdot \pi^\frac56}{\operatorname{AGM}\left(1+\sqrt{3},\sqrt{8}\right)^\frac23}.$$

Other formulas include the infinite products

$$\Gamma\left(\tfrac14\right) = (2 \pi)^\frac34 \prod_{k=1}^\infty \tanh \left( \frac{\pi k}{2} \right)$$

and

$$\Gamma\left(\tfrac14\right) = A^3 e^{-\frac{G}{\pi}} 2^\frac16\sqrt{\pi} \prod_{k=1}^\infty \left(1-\frac{1}{2k}\right)^{k(-1)^k}$$

where A is the Glaisher–Kinkelin constant and G is Catalan's constant.

The following two representations for Γ(3/4) were given by I. Mező

$$\sqrt{\frac{\pi\sqrt{e^\pi}}{2}}\frac{1}{\Gamma\left(\frac34\right)^2}=i\sum_{k=-\infty}^\infty e^{\pi(k-2k^2)}\theta_1\left(\frac{i\pi}{2}(2k-1),e^{-\pi}\right),$$

and

$$\sqrt{\frac{\pi}{2}}\frac{1}{\Gamma\left(\frac34\right)^2}=\sum_{k=-\infty}^\infty\frac{\theta_4(ik\pi,e^{-\pi})}{e^{2\pi k^2}},$$

where θ_{1} and θ_{4} are two of the Jacobi theta functions.

There also exist a number of Malmsten integrals for certain values of the gamma function:

$$\int_1^\infty \frac{\ln \ln t}{1+t^2} = \frac\pi4\left(2\ln2 + 3\ln\pi-4\Gamma\left(\tfrac14\right)\right)$$
$$\int_1^\infty \frac{\ln \ln t}{1+t+t^2} = \frac\pi{6\sqrt3}\left(8\ln2\pi -3\ln3 -12\Gamma\left(\tfrac13\right)\right)$$

One also has (see and):

$\operatorname{Ai}(0) = \frac{1}{3^{2/3} \, \Gamma\!\left(\frac{2}{3}\right)}$, $\operatorname{Bi}(0) = \frac{1}{3^{1/6} \, \Gamma\!\left(\frac{2}{3}\right)}$ $\zeta_{\mathrm{Ai}}(2)=\frac{3^{5/3}\Gamma^4(\frac23)}{4\pi^2}$

where Ai(x), Bi(x) are Airy functions and $\zeta_{\mathrm{Ai}}(x)$ denotes the Airy zeta function.

== Products ==
Some product identities include:

$\prod_{r=1}^2 \Gamma\left(\tfrac{r}{3}\right) = \frac{2\pi}{\sqrt 3} \approx 3.627\,598\,728\,468\,435\,7012$ OEIS: A186706
$\prod_{r=1}^3 \Gamma\left(\tfrac{r}{4}\right) = \sqrt{2\pi^3} \approx 7.874\,804\,972\,861\,209\,8721$ OEIS: A220610
$$\prod_{r=1}^4 \Gamma\left(\tfrac{r}{5}\right) = \frac{4\pi^2}{\sqrt 5} \approx 17.655\,285\,081\,493\,524\,2483$$
$$\prod_{r=1}^5 \Gamma\left(\tfrac{r}{6}\right) = 4\sqrt{\frac{\pi^5}3} \approx 40.399\,319\,122\,003\,790\,0785$$
$$\prod_{r=1}^6 \Gamma\left(\tfrac{r}{7}\right) = \frac{8\pi^3}{\sqrt 7} \approx 93.754\,168\,203\,582\,503\,7970$$
$$\prod_{r=1}^7 \Gamma\left(\tfrac{r}{8}\right) = 4\sqrt{\pi^7} \approx 219.828\,778\,016\,957\,263\,6207$$

In general:

$$\prod_{r=1}^n \Gamma\left(\tfrac{r}{n+1}\right) = \sqrt{\frac{(2\pi)^n}{n+1}}$$

From those products can be deduced other values, for example, from the former equations for $\prod_{r=1}^3 \Gamma\left(\tfrac{r}{4}\right)$, $\Gamma\left(\tfrac{1}{4}\right)$ and $\Gamma\left(\tfrac{2}{4}\right)$, can be deduced:

$\Gamma\left(\tfrac{3}{4}\right) =\left(\tfrac{\pi} {2}\right) ^{\tfrac{1}{4}} {\operatorname{AGM}\left(\sqrt 2, 1\right)}^{\tfrac{1}{2}}$

Other rational relations include

$$\frac{\Gamma\left(\tfrac15\right)\Gamma\left(\tfrac{4}{15}\right)}{\Gamma\left(\tfrac13\right)\Gamma\left(\tfrac{2}{15}\right)} = \frac{\sqrt{2}\,\sqrt[20]{3}}{\sqrt[6]{5}\,\sqrt[4]{5-\frac{7}{\sqrt 5}+\sqrt{6-\frac{6}{\sqrt 5}}}}$$

$\frac{\Gamma\left(\tfrac{1}{20}\right)\Gamma\left(\tfrac{9}{20}\right)}{\Gamma\left(\tfrac{3}{20}\right)\Gamma\left(\tfrac{7}{20}\right)} = \frac{\sqrt[4]{5}\left(1+\sqrt{5}\right)}{2}$

$$\frac{\Gamma\left(\frac{1}{5}\right)^2}{\Gamma\left(\frac{1}{10}\right)\Gamma\left(\frac{3}{10}\right)} = \frac{\sqrt{1+\sqrt{5}}}{2^{\tfrac{7}{10}}\sqrt[4]{5}}$$

and many more relations for Γ(n/d) where the denominator d divides 24 or 60.

Gamma quotients with algebraic values must be "poised" in the sense that the sum of arguments is the same (modulo 1) for the denominator and the numerator.

A more sophisticated example:

$\frac{ \Gamma\left(\frac{11}{42}\right)\Gamma\left(\frac27\right)}{\Gamma\left(\frac1{21}\right)\Gamma\left(\frac1{2}\right)} = \frac{8 \sin\left(\frac\pi7\right) \sqrt{\sin\left(\frac\pi{21}\right) \sin\left(\frac{4\pi}{21}\right) \sin\left(\frac{5\pi}{21}\right)}}{2^{\frac1{42}}3^{\frac9{28}}7^{\frac13}}$

== Imaginary and complex arguments ==
The gamma function at the imaginary unit i = √−1 gives OEIS: A212877, OEIS: A212878:

$$\Gamma(i) = (-1+i)! \approx -0.1549 - 0.4980i.$$

It may also be given in terms of the Barnes G-function:

$$\Gamma(i) = \frac{G(1+i)}{G(i)} = e^{-\log G(i)+ \log G(1+i)}.$$

$\Gamma(i)$ appears in the below integral evaluation:

$$\int_0^{\pi/2}\{\cot(x)\}\,dx=1-\frac{\pi}{2}+\frac{i}{2}\log\left(\frac{\pi}{\sinh(\pi)\Gamma(i)^2}\right).$$

Here $\{\cdot\}$ denotes the fractional part.

Because of the Euler Reflection Formula, and the fact that $\Gamma(\bar{z})=\bar{\Gamma}(z)$, we have an expression for the modulus squared of the Gamma function evaluated on the imaginary axis:

$$\left|\Gamma(i\kappa)\right|^2=\frac{\pi}{\kappa\sinh(\pi\kappa)}$$

The above integral therefore relates to the phase of $\Gamma(i)$.

The gamma function with other complex arguments returns

$$\Gamma(1 + i) = i\Gamma(i) \approx 0.498 - 0.155i$$
$$\Gamma(1 - i) = -i\Gamma(-i) \approx 0.498 + 0.155i$$
$$\Gamma(\tfrac12 + \tfrac12 i) \approx 0.818\,163\,9995 - 0.763\,313\,8287\, i$$
$$\Gamma(\tfrac12 - \tfrac12 i) \approx 0.818\,163\,9995 + 0.763\,313\,8287\, i$$
$$\Gamma(5 + 3i) \approx 0.016\,041\,8827 - 9.433\,293\,2898\, i$$
$$\Gamma(5 - 3i) \approx 0.016\,041\,8827 + 9.433\,293\,2898\, i.$$

== Other constants ==
The gamma function has a local minimum on the positive real axis

$x_{\min} = 1.461\,632\,144\,968\,362\,341\,262\,659\,5423\ldots\,$ OEIS: A030169

with the value

$\Gamma\left(x_{\min}\right) = 0.885\,603\,194\,410\,888\,700\,278\,815\,9005\ldots\,$ OEIS: A030171.

Integrating the reciprocal gamma function along the positive real axis also gives the Fransén–Robinson constant.

On the negative real axis, the first local maxima and minima (zeros of the digamma function) are:

Approximate local extrema of Γ(x)
x	Γ(x)	OEIS
−0.5040830082644554092582693045	−3.5446436111550050891219639933	OEIS: A175472
−1.5734984731623904587782860437	2.3024072583396801358235820396	OEIS: A175473
−2.6107208684441446500015377157	−0.8881363584012419200955280294	OEIS: A175474
−3.6352933664369010978391815669	0.2451275398343662504382300889	OEIS: A256681
−4.6532377617431424417145981511	−0.0527796395873194007604835708	OEIS: A256682
−5.6671624415568855358494741745	0.0093245944826148505217119238	OEIS: A256683
−6.6784182130734267428298558886	−0.0013973966089497673013074887	OEIS: A256684
−7.6877883250316260374400988918	0.0001818784449094041881014174	OEIS: A256685
−8.6957641638164012664887761608	−0.0000209252904465266687536973	OEIS: A256686
−9.7026725400018637360844267649	0.0000021574161045228505405031	OEIS: A256687

The only values of x > 0 for which Γ(x) = x are x = 1 and x ≈ 3.5623822853908976914156443427... OEIS: A218802.

== See also ==
- Chowla–Selberg formula
