= Hyperfactorial =

Number computed as a product of powers

In mathematics, and more specifically number theory, the hyperfactorial of a positive integer $n$ is the product of the numbers of the form $x^x$ from $1^1$ to $n^n$.

== Definition ==
The hyperfactorial of a positive integer $n$ is the product of the numbers $1^1, 2^2, \dots, n^n$. That is,
$$H(n) = 1^1\cdot 2^2\cdot \cdots n^n = \prod_{i=1}^{n} i^i = n^n H(n-1).$$
Following the usual convention for the empty product, the hyperfactorial of 0 is 1. The sequence of hyperfactorials, beginning with $H(0)=1$, is:

1, 1, 4, 108, 27648, 86400000, 4031078400000, 3319766398771200000, ... (sequence A002109 in the OEIS)

== Interpolation and approximation ==
The hyperfactorials were studied beginning in the 19th century by Hermann Kinkelin and James Whitbread Lee Glaisher. As Kinkelin showed, just as the factorials can be continuously interpolated by the gamma function, the hyperfactorials can be continuously interpolated by the K-function as $K(n+1)= H(n)$.

Glaisher provided an asymptotic formula for the hyperfactorials, analogous to Stirling's formula for the factorials:
$$H(n) = An^{(6n^2+6n+1)/12}e^{-n^2/4}\left(1+\frac{1}{720n^2}-\frac{1433}{7257600n^4}+\cdots\right)\!,$$
where $A\approx 1.28243$ is the Glaisher–Kinkelin constant.

== Other properties ==
According to an analogue of Wilson's theorem on the behavior of factorials modulo prime numbers, when $p$ is an odd prime number
$$H(p-1)\equiv(-1)^{(p-1)/2}(p-1)!!\pmod{p},$$
where $!!$ is the notation for the double factorial.

The hyperfactorials give the sequence of discriminants of Hermite polynomials in their probabilistic formulation.

== See also ==
- Superfactorial
