= Glaisher–Kinkelin constant =

Mathematical constant

In mathematics, the Glaisher–Kinkelin constant or Glaisher's constant, typically denoted A, is a mathematical constant, related to special functions like the K-function and the Barnes G-function. The constant also appears in a number of sums and integrals, especially those involving the gamma function and the Riemann zeta function. It is named after mathematicians James Whitbread Lee Glaisher and Hermann Kinkelin.

Its approximate value is:

A = 1.28242712910062263687... (sequence A074962 in the OEIS).

Glaisher's constant plays a role both in mathematics and in physics. It appears when giving a closed form expression for Porter's constant, when estimating the efficiency of the Euclidean algorithm. It also is connected to solutions of Painlevé differential equations and the Gaudin model.

== Definition ==
The Glaisher–Kinkelin constant A can be defined via the following limit:

$$A=\lim_{n\rightarrow\infty} \frac{H(n)}{n^{\tfrac{n^2}{2}+\tfrac{n}{2}+\tfrac{1}{12}}\,e^{-\tfrac{n^2}{4}}}$$

where $H(n)$ is the hyperfactorial:
$$H(n)= \prod_{i=1}^{n} i^i = 1^1\cdot 2^2\cdot 3^3 \cdot {...}\cdot n^n$$
An analogous limit, presenting a similarity between $A$ and $\sqrt{2\pi}$, is given by Stirling's formula as:

$$\sqrt{2\pi}=\lim_{n \to \infty} \frac{n!}{n^{n+\frac12}\,e^{-n}}$$

with
$$n!= \prod_{i=1}^{n} i = 1 \cdot 2\cdot 3\cdot  {...} \cdot n$$
which shows that just as π is obtained from approximation of the factorials, A is obtained from the approximation of the hyperfactorials.

== Relation to special functions ==
Just as the factorials can be extended to the complex numbers by the gamma function such that $\Gamma(n)=(n-1)!$ for positive integers n, the hyperfactorials can be extended by the K-function with $K(n)= H(n-1)$ also for positive integers n, where:

$$K(z)=(2\pi)^{-\frac{z-1}2} \exp\left[\binom{z}{2}+\int_0^{z-1} \ln \Gamma(t + 1)\,dt\right]$$

This gives:

$$A=\lim_{n\rightarrow\infty} \frac{K(n+1)}{n^{\tfrac{n^2}{2}+\tfrac{n}{2}+\tfrac{1}{12}}\,e^{-\tfrac{n^2}{4}}}$$.

A related function is the Barnes G-function which is given by

$$G(n)=\frac{(\Gamma(n))^{n-1}}{K(n)}$$

and for which a similar limit exists:

$$\frac1A=\lim_{n\rightarrow\infty} \frac{G(n+1)}{\left(2\pi\right)^\frac{n}{2} n^{\frac{n^2}{2}-\frac{1}{12}} e^{-\frac{3n^2}{4}+\frac{1}{12}}}$$.

The Glaisher-Kinkelin constant also appears in the evaluation of the K-function and Barnes-G function at half and quarter integer values such as:

$$K(1/2) = \frac{A^{3/2}}{2^{1/24}e^{1/8}}$$

$$K(1/4) = A^{9/8}\exp\left(\frac{G}{4\pi}-\frac{3}{32}\right)$$

$$G(1/2) = \frac{2^{1/24}e^{1/8}}{A^{3/2}\pi^{1/4}}$$

$$G(1/4) = \frac{1}{2^{9/16}A^{9/8}\pi^{3/16}\varpi^{3/8}}\exp\left(\frac{3}{32}-\frac{G}{4\pi}\right)$$

with $G$ being Catalan's constant and $\varpi=\frac{\Gamma(1/4)^2}{2\sqrt{2\pi}}$ being the lemniscate constant.

Similar to the gamma function, there exists a multiplication formula for the K-function. It involves Glaisher's constant:

$$\prod_{j=1}^{n-1}K\left(\frac jn \right) = A^{\frac{n^2-1}{n}}n^{-\frac{1}{12n}}e^{\frac{1-n^2}{12n}}$$

The logarithm of G(z + 1) has the following asymptotic expansion, as established by Barnes:

$$\ln G(z+1) = \frac{z^2}{2} \ln z - \frac{3z^2}{4} + \frac{z}{2}\ln 2\pi -\frac{1}{12} \ln z + \left(\frac{1}{12}-\ln A \right)+\sum_{k=1}^N \frac{B_{2k + 2}}{4k\left(k + 1\right)z^{2k}}+O\left(\frac{1}{z^{2N + 2}}\right)$$

The Glaisher-Kinkelin constant is related to the derivatives of the Euler-constant function:

$$\gamma'(-1)= \frac{11}{6}\ln2 + 6\ln A - \frac32 \ln\pi - 1$$
$$\gamma''(-1) = \frac{10}{3}\ln2 + 24\ln A - 4 \ln\pi  - \frac{7\zeta(3)}{2\pi^2}- \frac{13}{4}$$

$A$ also is related to the Lerch transcendent:

$$\frac{\partial\Phi}{\partial s}(-1,-1,1)=3\ln A - \frac13\ln2 - \frac 14$$

Glaisher's constant may be used to give values of the derivative of the Riemann zeta function as closed form expressions, such as:

$$\zeta'(-1)=\frac{1}{12}-\ln A$$

$$\zeta'(2)=\frac{\pi^2} 6  \left( \gamma+\ln 2\pi - 12 \ln A \right)$$

where γ is the Euler–Mascheroni constant.

== Series expressions ==
The above formula for $\zeta'(2)$ gives the following series:

$$\sum_{k=2}^\infty \frac{\ln k}{k^2}=\frac{\pi^2} 6  \left( 12 \ln A - \gamma-\ln 2\pi \right)$$

which directly leads to the following product found by Glaisher:

$$\prod_{k=1}^\infty k^\frac{1}{k^2} = \left(\frac{A^{12}}{2\pi e^\gamma} \right)^\frac{\pi^2}{6}$$

Similarly it is

$$\sum_{k\ge 3}^{k\text{ odd}} \frac{\ln k}{k^2}=\frac{\pi^2}{24}  \left( 36  \ln A - 3 \gamma -  \ln 16\pi^3  \right)$$

which gives:

$$\prod_{k\ge 3}^{k\text{ odd}} k^\frac{1}{k^2} = \left(\frac{A^{36}}{16\pi^3 e^{3\gamma}} \right)^\frac{\pi^2}{24}$$

An alternative product formula, defined over the prime numbers, reads:

$$\prod_{p \text{ prime}} p^\frac{1}{p^2-1} = \frac{A^{12}}{2\pi e^\gamma},$$

Another product is given by:

$$\prod_{n=1}^\infty \left(\frac{en^n}{(n+1)^n}\right)^{(-1)^{n-1}} = \frac{2^{1/6} e\sqrt\pi}{A^6}$$

A series involving the cosine integral is:

$$\sum_{k=1}^\infty \frac{\text{Ci}(2k\pi)}{k^2}=\frac{\pi^2}{2}(4\ln A -1)$$

Helmut Hasse gave another series representation for the logarithm of Glaisher's constant, following from a series for the Riemann zeta function:

$$\ln A=\frac 1 8 - \frac 1 2  \sum_{n=0}^\infty \frac 1 {n+1} \sum_{k=0}^n (-1)^k \binom n k (k+1)^2 \ln(k+1)$$

== Integrals ==
The following are some definite integrals involving Glaisher's constant:

$$\int_0^\infty \frac{x \ln x}{e^{2 \pi x}-1} \, dx = \frac 1 {24}-\frac 1 2 \ln A$$

$$\int_0^\frac12 \ln\Gamma(x) \, dx = \frac 3 2 \ln A+\frac 5 {24} \ln 2+\frac 1 4 \ln \pi$$

the latter being a special case of:

$$\int_0^z \ln \Gamma(x)\,dx=\frac{z(1-z)}{2}+\frac{z}{2}\ln 2\pi +z\ln\Gamma(z) -\ln G(1+z)$$

A double integral is given by:

$$\int_0^1 \int_0^1 \frac{-x}{(1+xy)^2\ln xy}dxdy= 6\ln A - \frac16 \ln 2 - \frac12 \ln\pi  - \frac12$$

== Generalizations ==
The Glaisher-Kinkelin constant can be viewed as the first constant in a sequence of infinitely many so-called generalized Glaisher constants or Bendersky constants. They emerge from studying the following product:
$$\prod_{m=1}^{n} m^{m^k} = 1^{1^k} \cdot 2^{2^k}\cdot 3^{3^k}\cdot  {...} \cdot n^{n^k}$$
Setting $k = 0$ gives the factorial $n!$, while choosing $k = 1$ gives the hyperfactorial $H(n)$.

Defining the following function
$$P_k(n) = \left(\frac{n^{k+1}}{k+1}+\frac{n^k}{2}+\frac{B_{k+1}}{k+1}\right)\ln n - \frac{n^{k+1}}{(k+1)^2}+k!\sum_{j=1}^{k-1} \frac{B_{j+1}}{(j+1)!}\frac{n^{k-j}}{(k-j)!}\left(\ln n + \sum_{i=1}^j \frac{1}{k-i+1}\right)$$
with the Bernoulli numbers $B_k$ (and using $B_1=0$), one may approximate the above products asymptotically via $\exp({P_k(n)})$.

For $k = 0$ we get Stirling's approximation without the factor $\sqrt{2\pi}$ as $\exp({P_0(n)})=n^{n+\frac12} e^{-n}$.

For $k = 1$ we obtain $\exp({P_1(n)})=n^{\tfrac{n^2}{2}+\tfrac{n}{2}+\tfrac{1}{12}}\,e^{-\tfrac{n^2}{4}}$, similar as in the limit definition of $A$.

This leads to the following definition of the generalized Glaisher constants:

$$A_k:=\lim_{n\rightarrow\infty} \left( e^{-P_k(n)} \prod_{m=1}^{n} m^{m^k}\right)$$

which may also be written as:

$$\ln A_k:=\lim_{n\rightarrow\infty} \left(-P_k(n)+\sum_{m=1}^{n} {m^k}\ln m\right)$$

This gives $A_0=\sqrt{2\pi}$ and $A_1=A$ and in general:

$$A_k=\exp\left(\frac{B_{k+1}}{k+1}H_k-\zeta'(-k)\right)$$

with the harmonic numbers $H_k$ and $H_0=0$.

Because of the formula

$$\zeta'(-2m)=(-1)^m \frac{(2m)!}{2(2\pi)^{2m}}\zeta(2m+1)$$

for $m > 0$, there exist closed form expressions for $A_{k}$ with even $k=2m$ in terms of the values of the Riemann zeta function such as:

$$A_2=\exp\left(\frac{\zeta(3)}{4\pi^2}\right)$$

$$A_4=\exp\left(-\frac{3\zeta(5)}{4\pi^4}\right)$$

For odd $k=2m-1$ one can express the constants $A_{k}$ in terms of the derivative of the Riemann zeta function such as:

$$A_1=\exp\left(-\frac{\zeta'(2)}{2\pi^2}+\frac{\gamma+\ln2\pi}{12}\right)$$

$$A_3=\exp\left(\frac{3\zeta'(4)}{4\pi^4}-\frac{\gamma+\ln2\pi}{120}\right)$$

The numerical values of the first few generalized Glaisher constants are given below:

k	Value of A_{k} to 50 decimal digits	OEIS
0	2.50662827463100050241576528481104525300698674060993...	A019727
1	1.28242712910062263687534256886979172776768892732500...	A074962
2	1.03091675219739211419331309646694229063319430640348...	A243262
3	0.97955552694284460582421883726349182644553675249552...	A243263
4	0.99204797452504026001343697762544335673690485127618...	A243264
5	1.00968038728586616112008919046263069260327634721152...	A243265
6	1.00591719699867346844401398355425565639061565500693...	A266553
7	0.98997565333341709417539648305886920020824715143074...	A266554
8	0.99171832163282219699954748276579333986785976057305...	A266555
9	1.01846992992099291217065904937667217230861019056407...	A266556
10	1.01911023332938385372216470498629751351348137284099...	A266557

== See also ==
- Hyperfactorial
- Superfactorial
- Stirling's approximation
- List of mathematical constants
