= Mangold =

Mangold (also Mangoldt, Mangolt) is a German surname, in origin from a given name. It was the name of a noble family of Altenburger, Weißenfels, given for one Manegoldus de Weißenfels, a forebearer to the house of Thuringia. The name Mangold is currently most widespread in the southwestern German state of Baden Württemberg.

https://www.heraldrysinstitute.com/lang/en/cognomi/Mangold/Germany+-+Switzerland/idc/731831/idt/en/

https://www.armorial.org/produit/91851/mangold.html

== Given name ==
- (fl. 1260), founder of the house of Weißenfels.
- Mangold vow (d. 1385), bishop of Constance.

== Surname ==
People with the surname include:

von Mangoldt

- Hans Carl Friedrich von Mangoldt (1854–1925), German mathematician

Mangold

- Andrej Mangold (born 1987), German basketball player
- Carl Amand Mangold (1813–1889), German composer
- Christoph Mangold (1719–1767), German anatomist and chemist
- Erni Mangold (1927–2026), Austrian actress and stage director
- Fritz Mangold (1871–1944), Swiss statistician and politician
- Hilde Mangold (1898–1924; née Proscholdt), German developmental biologist
- Holley Mangold (born 1989), American Female Weightlifter
- James Mangold (born 1963), American director and script writer
- Julia Mangold (born 1966), German artist
- Katharina Mangold-Wirz (1922–2003) Swiss Marine Biologist
- Kevin Mangold (born 1968), American professional Thoroughbred jockey, stunt man and actor
- Marie Cecilia Mangold (1872–1934), American mathematician, educator, nun
- Mike Mangold (1955–2015), American aerobatics pilot
- Nick Mangold (1984–2025), American football player
- Robert Mangold (born 1937), American artist
- Sylvia Plimack Mangold (born 1938), American artist
- Tom Mangold (born 1934), British investigative journalist and author

== See also ==
- Mangold v Helm
- Von Mangoldt function, an arithmetic function named for Hans Carl Friedrich von Mangoldt.
