= Margold =

Margold is a surname. Notable people with the surname include:

- Nathan Ross Margold (1899–1947), Romanian-born American lawyer
- William Margold (1943–2017), American pornographic film actor and porn film director

== See also ==
- Mangold
