= Swiss Society of Economics and Statistics =

Swiss learned society

The Swiss Society of Economics and Statistics (SSES) (German: Schweizerische Gesellschaft für Volkswirtschaft und Statistik (SGVS), French: Société suisse d'économie et de statistique (SSES); Italian: Società svizzera di economia e di statistica (SSES)) is a Swiss learned society for economics and an association comprising all Swiss universities with faculties of economics, based in Zurich. Kurt Schmidheiny from the University of Basel serves as the current president of the SSES. The society is a member of the Swiss Academy of Humanities and Social Sciences. The SSES holds an ex officio position on the executive council of the Verein für Socialpolitik. The society publishes the Swiss Journal of Economics and Statistics, an open-access peer-reviewed academic journal.

== History ==
The society was founded in 1864 as the Swiss Statistical Society (German: Schweizerische Statistische Gesellschaft, (SSG)). In 1937, it changed its name to the Swiss Society for Statistics and Economics (German: Schweizerische Gesellschaft für Statistik und Volkswirtschaft, (SGSV)). In 2001, the name was slightly altered to the Swiss Society of Economics and Statistics (German: Schweizerische Gesellschaft für Volkswirtschaft und Statistik, (SGVS)).

The topics discussed at the annual meetings of the SSES are regularly covered in Swiss newspapers. These meetings attract figures in municipal, cantonal, and federal government in Switzerland, alongside economists and scientists from Switzerland and abroad. Past topics have included the industrialisation of Switzerland, full employment and the right to work, population dynamics and the social position of women, competition, dirigisme and regulation, and the European debt crisis.

The SSES gives several annual awards, including an Economic Journalism Award for journalists.

== Presidents ==
The following persons have been presidents:

- 1864—1866: Johann Ludwig Spyri
- 1866—1871: Ludwig Kurz
- 1871—1876: Constant Bodenheimer
- 1877—1886: Hermann Kinkelin
- 1886—1913: Johann Jakob Kummer
- 1913—1919: Edmund Wilhelm Milliet
- 1920—1925: Fritz Mangold
- 1926: Hans Schorer
- 1927—1930: William Rappard
- 1931—1934: Eugen Grossmann
- 1934—1937: Paul Victor Keller
- 1938—1941: Carl Brüschweiler
- 1941—1944: Ernst Ackermann
- 1944—1947: Hugo Gschwind
- 1947—1949: Paul-René Rosset
- 1949—1952: Théo Keller
- 1952—1954: Eugen Böhler
- 1954—1957: Jean Golay
- 1957—1960: Walter Adolf Jöhr
- 1960—1963: Frédéric Scheurer
- 1963—1966: Wilhelm Martin Bickel
- 1966—1969: Pierre Goetschin
- 1969—1970: Hugo Sieber
- 1972—1975: Luigi Solari
- 1975—1978: Kurt Steuber
- 1978—1981: Silvio Borner
- 1981—1984: Pietro Balestra
- 1984—1987: Kurt Schiltknecht
- 1987—1989: Jacques Pasquier-Dorthe
- 1990—1993: René Leo Frey
- 1993—1996: Claude Jeanrenaud
- 1996—1999: Ernst Baltensperger
- 1999—2001: Georg Rich
- 2002—2005: Alexandre Swoboda
- 2006—2008: Peter Kugler
- 2008—2011: Gebhard Kirchgässner
- 2011—2013: Philippe Bacchetta
- 2014—2017: Monika Bütler
- 2017—2020: Yvan Michel Lengwiler
- 2020—2023: Dirk Niepelt
- 2023—present: Kurt Schmidheiny

== Notable members ==
- Johannes Stössel
