= K-function =

Concept in mathematics

In mathematics, the K-function, typically denoted K(z), is a generalization of the hyperfactorial to complex numbers, similar to the generalization of the factorial to the gamma function.

== Definition ==
There are multiple equivalent definitions of the K-function.

The direct definition:

$$K(z)=(2\pi)^{-\frac{z-1}2} \exp\left[\binom{z}{2}+\int_0^{z-1} \ln \Gamma(t + 1)\,dt\right].$$

Definition via

$$K(z)=\exp\bigl[\zeta'(-1,z)-\zeta'(-1)\bigr]$$

where ζ′(z) denotes the derivative of the Riemann zeta function, ζ(a,z) denotes the Hurwitz zeta function and

$$\zeta'(a,z)\ \stackrel{\mathrm{def}}{=}\ \left.\frac{\partial\zeta(s,z)}{\partial s}\right|_{s=a},\ \ \zeta(s,q) = \sum_{k=0}^\infty (k+q)^{-s}$$

Definition via polygamma function:

$$K(z)=\exp\left[\psi^{(-2)}(z)+\frac{z^2-z}{2}-\frac {z}{2} \ln 2\pi \right]$$

Definition via balanced generalization of the polygamma function:

$$K(z)=A \exp\left[\psi(-2,z)+\frac{z^2-z}{2}\right]$$

where A is the Glaisher constant.

It can be defined via unique characterization, similar to how the gamma function can be uniquely characterized by the Bohr-Mollerup Theorem:

Let $f: (0, \infty) \to \R$ be a solution to the functional equation $f(x+1) - f(x)=x\ln x$, such that there exists some $M > 0$, such that given any distinct $x_0, x_1, x_2, x_3 \in (M, \infty)$, the divided difference $f[x_0, x_1, x_2, x_3] \geq 0$. Such functions are precisely $f = \ln K + C$, where $C$ is an arbitrary constant.

== Properties ==
For α > 0:

$$\int_\alpha^{\alpha+1}\ln K(x)\,dx-\int_0^1\ln K(x)\,dx=\tfrac{1}{2}\alpha^2\left(\ln\alpha-\tfrac{1}{2}\right)$$

Proof
Proof

Let $f(\alpha)=\int_\alpha^{\alpha+1}\ln K(x)\,dx$

Differentiating this identity now with respect to α yields:

$$f'(\alpha)=\ln K(\alpha+1)-\ln K(\alpha)$$

Applying the logarithm rule we get

$$f'(\alpha)=\ln\frac{K(\alpha+1)}{K(\alpha)}$$

By the definition of the K-function we write

$$f'(\alpha)=\alpha\ln\alpha$$

And so

$$f(\alpha)=\tfrac12\alpha^2\left(\ln\alpha-\tfrac12\right)+C$$

Setting α = 0 we have

$$\int_0^1 \ln K(x)\,dx=\lim_{t\rightarrow0}\left[\tfrac12 t^2\left(\ln t-\tfrac12\right)\right]+C \ =C$$

=== Functional equations ===
The K-function is closely related to the gamma function and the Barnes G-function. For all complex $z$,
$$K(z) G(z)=e^{(z-1) \ln \Gamma(z)}$$

=== Multiplication formula ===
Similar to the multiplication formula for the gamma function:

$$\prod_{j=1}^{n-1}\Gamma\left(\frac jn \right) = \sqrt{\frac{(2\pi)^{n-1}}{n}}$$

there exists a multiplication formula for the K-Function involving Glaisher's constant:

$$\prod_{j=1}^{n-1}K\left(\frac jn \right) = A^{\frac{n^2-1}{n}}n^{-\frac{1}{12n}}e^{\frac{1-n^2}{12n}}$$

=== Integer values ===
For all non-negative integers,
$$K(n+1)=1^1 \cdot 2^2 \cdot 3^3 \cdots n^n = H(n)$$
where $H$ is the hyperfactorial.

The first values are

1, 4, 108, 27648, 86400000, 4031078400000, 3319766398771200000, ... (sequence A002109 in the OEIS).
