= Balanced polygamma function =

In mathematics, the generalized polygamma function or balanced negapolygamma function is a function introduced by Olivier Espinosa Aldunate and Victor Hugo Moll.

It generalizes the polygamma function to negative and fractional order, but remains equal to it for integer positive orders.

== Definition ==
The generalized polygamma function is defined as follows:

$$\psi(z,q)=\frac{\zeta'(z+1,q)+\bigl(\psi(-z)+\gamma \bigr) \zeta (z+1,q)}{\Gamma (-z)}$$

or alternatively,

$$\psi(z,q)=e^{- \gamma z}\frac{\partial}{\partial z}\left(e^{\gamma z}\frac{\zeta(z+1,q)}{\Gamma(-z)}\right),$$

where ψ(z) is the polygamma function and ζ(z,q), is the Hurwitz zeta function.

The function is balanced, in that it satisfies the conditions

$$f(0)=f(1) \quad \text{and} \quad \int_0^1 f(x)\, dx = 0$$.

== Relations ==
Several special functions can be expressed in terms of generalized polygamma function.

$$\begin{align}
\psi(x) &= \psi(0,x)\\
\psi^{(n)}(x)&=\psi(n,x) \qquad n\in\mathbb{N} \\
\Gamma(x)&=\exp\left( \psi(-1,x)+\tfrac12 \ln 2\pi \right)\\
\zeta(z, q)&=\frac{(-1)^z}{\Gamma(z)} \psi(z - 1, q)\\
\zeta'(-1,x)&=\psi(-2, x) + \frac{x^2}2 - \frac{x}2 + \frac1{12} \\
\end{align}$$

$$K(z)=A \exp\left(\psi(-2,z)+\frac{z^2-z}{2}\right)$$

where K(z) is the K-function and A is the Glaisher constant.

== Special values ==
The balanced polygamma function can be expressed in a closed form at certain points (where A is the Glaisher constant and G is the Catalan constant):

$$\begin{align}
\psi\left(-2,\tfrac14\right)&=\tfrac18\ln A+\frac{G}{4\pi} && \\
\psi\left(-2,\tfrac12\right)&=\tfrac12\ln A-\tfrac{1}{24}\ln 2 & \\
\psi\left(-3,\tfrac12\right)&=\frac{3\zeta(3)}{32\pi^2}\\
\psi(-2,1)&=-\ln A &\\
\psi(-3,1)&=\frac{-\zeta(3)}{8\pi^2}\\
\psi(-2,2)&=-\ln A-1 &\\
\psi(-3,2)&=\frac{-\zeta(3)}{8\pi^2}-\tfrac34 \\\end{align}$$
