= Jordan–Pólya number =

Number that is the product of factorials

A tree that (as an abstract graph) has 480 symmetries (automorphisms). There are 2 ways of permuting the two children of the upper left vertex, 2 ways of permuting the two children of the upper middle vertex, and 5! = 120 ways of permuting the five children of the upper right vertex, for 2 · 2 · 120 = 480 symmetries altogether.

In mathematics, the Jordan–Pólya numbers are the numbers that can be obtained by multiplying together one or more factorials, not required to be distinct from each other. For instance, $480$ is a Jordan–Pólya number because $480=2!\cdot 2!\cdot5!$. Every tree has a number of symmetries that is a Jordan–Pólya number, and every Jordan–Pólya number arises in this way as the order of an automorphism group of a tree. These numbers are named after Camille Jordan and George Pólya, who both wrote about them in the context of symmetries of trees.

These numbers grow more quickly than polynomials but more slowly than exponentials. As well as in the symmetries of trees, they arise as the numbers of transitive orientations of comparability graphs and in the problem of finding factorials that can be represented as products of smaller factorials.

== Sequence and growth rate ==
The sequence of Jordan–Pólya numbers begins:

1, 2, 4, 6, 8, 12, 16, 24, 32, 36, 48, 64, 72, 96, 120, 128, 144, 192, 216, 240, 256, ... (sequence A001013 in the OEIS)

They form the smallest multiplicatively closed set containing all of the factorials.

The $n$th Jordan–Pólya number grows more quickly than any polynomial of $n$, but more slowly than any exponential function of $n$. More precisely, for every $\varepsilon>0$, and every sufficiently large $x$ (depending on $\varepsilon$), the number $J(x)$ of Jordan–Pólya numbers up to $x$ obeys the inequalities
$$\exp\frac{(2-\varepsilon)\sqrt{\log x}}{\log\log x} < J(x) <
\exp\frac{(4+\varepsilon)\sqrt{\log x}\log\log\log x}{\log\log x}.$$

== Factorials that are products of smaller factorials ==
Every Jordan–Pólya number $n$, except 2, has the property that its factorial $n!$ can be written as a product of smaller factorials. This can be done simply by expanding $n!=n\cdot(n-1)!$ and then replacing $n$ in this product by its representation as a product of factorials. It is conjectured, but unproven, that the only numbers $n$ whose factorial $n!$ equals a product of smaller factorials are the Jordan–Pólya numbers (except 2) and the two exceptional numbers 9 and 10, for which $9!=2!\cdot3!\cdot3!\cdot7!$ and $10!=6!\cdot7!=3!\cdot5!\cdot7!$. The only other known representation of a factorial as a product of smaller factorials, not obtained by replacing $n$ in the product expansion of $n!$, is $16!=2!\cdot5!\cdot14!$, but as $16$ is itself a Jordan–Pólya number, it also has the representation $16!=2!^4\cdot 15!$.

== See also ==
- Superfactorial, the product of the first $n$ factorials
