= Legendre's formula =

Number theory expression

In mathematics, Legendre's formula gives an expression for the exponent of the largest power of a prime p that divides the factorial n!. It is named after Adrien-Marie Legendre. It is also sometimes known as de Polignac's formula, after Alphonse de Polignac.

== Statement ==
For any prime number p and any positive integer n, let $\nu_p(n)$ be the exponent of the largest power of p that divides n (that is, the p-adic valuation of n). Then

$$\nu_p(n!) = \sum_{i=1}^{\infty} \left\lfloor \frac{n}{p^i} \right\rfloor,$$

where $\lfloor x \rfloor$ is the floor function. While the sum on the right side is an infinite sum, for any particular values of n and p it has only finitely many nonzero terms: for every i large enough that $p^i > n$, one has $\textstyle \left\lfloor \frac{n}{p^i} \right\rfloor = 0$. This reduces the infinite sum above to

$$\nu_p(n!) = \sum_{i=1}^{L} \left\lfloor \frac{n}{p^i} \right\rfloor \, ,$$

where $L = \lfloor \log_{p} n \rfloor$.

=== Example ===
For n = 6, one has $6! = 1 \cdot 2 \cdot 3 \cdot 4 \cdot 5 \cdot 6 = 2^4 \cdot 3^2 \cdot 5^1$. The exponents $\nu_2(6!) = 4$, $\nu_3(6!) = 2$, and $\nu_5(6!) = 1$ can be computed by Legendre's formula as follows:

$$\begin{align}
\nu_2(6!) & = \sum_{i=1}^\infty \left\lfloor \frac 6 {2^i} \right\rfloor = \left\lfloor \frac 6 2 \right\rfloor + \left\lfloor \frac 6 4 \right\rfloor = 3 + 1 = 4, \\[3pt]
\nu_3(6!) & = \sum_{i=1}^\infty \left\lfloor \frac 6 {3^i} \right\rfloor = \left\lfloor \frac 6 3 \right\rfloor = 2, \\[3pt]
\nu_5(6!) & = \sum_{i=1}^\infty \left\lfloor \frac 6 {5^i} \right\rfloor = \left\lfloor \frac 6 5 \right\rfloor = 1.
\end{align}$$

=== Proof ===
Since $n!$ is the product of the integers 1 through n, we obtain at least one factor of p in $n!$ for each multiple of p in $\{1, 2, \dots, n\}$, of which there are $\textstyle \left\lfloor \frac{n}{p} \right\rfloor$. Each multiple of $p^2$ contributes an additional factor of p, each multiple of $p^3$ contributes yet another factor of p, etc. Adding up the number of these factors gives the infinite sum for $\nu_p(n!)$.

== Alternate form ==
One may also reformulate Legendre's formula in terms of the base-p expansion of n. Let $s_p(n)$ denote the sum of the digits in the base-p expansion of n; then

$$\nu_p(n!) = \frac{n - s_p(n)}{p - 1}.$$

For example, writing n = 6 in binary as 6_{10} = 110_{2}, we have that $s_2(6) = 1 + 1 + 0 = 2$ and so

$$\nu_2(6!) = \frac{6 - 2}{2 - 1} = 4.$$

Similarly, writing 6 in ternary as 6_{10} = 20_{3}, we have that $s_3(6) = 2 + 0 = 2$ and so

$$\nu_3(6!) = \frac{6 - 2}{3 - 1} = 2.$$

=== Proof ===
Write $n = n_\ell p^\ell + \cdots + n_1 p + n_0$ in base p. Then
$$\left\lfloor \frac{n}{p^i} \right\rfloor = n_\ell p^{\ell-i} + \cdots + n_{i+1} p + n_i = \sum_{j=i}^{\ell} n_j p^{j-i},$$
and therefore
$$\nu_p(n!) = \sum_{i=1}^{\ell} \sum_{j=i}^{\ell} n_j p^{j-i}.$$
Reversing the order of summation, reindexing, and summing a geometric series, this becomes
$$\nu_p(n!) = \sum_{j=1}^{\ell} \sum_{i=1}^{j} n_j p^{j-i} = \sum_{j=1}^{\ell} n_j \sum_{k = 0}^{j - 1} p^{k} = \sum_{j=1}^{\ell} n_j \cdot \frac{p^j - 1}{p - 1}.$$
Finally, by one further algebraic manipulation this yields
$$\nu_p(n!) = \frac{1}{p - 1} \sum_{j=0}^{\ell} \left(n_j p^j - n_j\right)
= \frac{1}{p - 1} \left(n - s_p(n)\right).$$

== Applications ==
Legendre's formula can be used to prove Kummer's theorem. As one special case, it can be used to prove that if n is a positive integer then 4 divides $\binom{2n}{n}$ if and only if n is not a power of 2.

It follows from Legendre's formula that the p-adic exponential function has radius of convergence $p^{-1/(p-1)}$.
