= Multiplicative partitions of factorials =

Multiplicative partitions of factorials are expressions of values of the factorial function as products of powers of prime numbers. They have been studied by Paul Erdős and others.

The factorial of a positive integer is a product of decreasing integer factors, which can in turn be factored into prime numbers. This means that any factorial can be written as a product of powers of primes. For example,
$$5! = 5 \cdot 4 \cdot 3 \cdot 2 = 5^1 \cdot 2^2 \cdot 3^1 \cdot 2^1.$$
If we wish to write $5!$ as a product of factors of the form $(p_k)^{b_k}$, where each $p_k$ is a prime number, and the factors are sorted in nondecreasing order, then we have three ways of doing so:
$$5! = 2^1 \cdot 3^1 \cdot 2^2 \cdot 5^1 = 3^1 \cdot 5^1 \cdot 2^3 = 2^1 \cdot 2^1 \cdot 2^1 \cdot 3^1 \cdot 5^1.$$
The number of such "sorted multiplicative partitions" of $n!$ grows with $n$, and is given by the sequence

1, 1, 3, 3, 10, 10, 30, 75, 220, 220, 588, 588, 1568, 3696, 11616, ... (sequence A085288 in the OEIS).

Not all sorted multiplicative partitions of a given factorial have the same length. For example, the partitions of $5!$ have lengths 4, 3 and 5. In other words, exactly one of the partitions of $5!$ has length 5. The number of sorted multiplicative partitions of $n!$ that have length equal to $n$ is 1 for $n = 4$ and $n = 5$, and thereafter increases as

2, 2, 5, 12, 31, 31, 78, 78, 191, 418, 1220, 1220, 3015, ... (sequence A085289 in the OEIS).

Consider all sorted multiplicative partitions of $n!$ that have length $n$, and find the partition whose first factor is the largest. (Since the first factor in a partition is the smallest within that partition, this means finding the maximum of all the minima.) Call this factor $m(n)$. The value of $m(n)$ is 2 for $n = 4$ and $n = 5$, and thereafter grows as

2, 2, 2, 3, 3, 3, 3, 3, 3, 4, 4, 4, 4, 4, 5, 5, 5, 5, 5, 5, 5, 5, 7, 7, 7, 7, 7, 7, ... (sequence A085290 in the OEIS).

To express the asymptotic behavior of $m(n)$, let
$$\alpha(n) = \frac{\ln m(n)}{\ln n}.$$
As $n$ tends to infinity, $\alpha(n)$ approaches a limiting value, the Alladi-Grinstead constant (named for the mathematicians Krishnaswami Alladi and Charles Grinstead). The decimal representation of the Alladi–Grinstead constant begins,

0.80939402054063913071793188059409131721595399242500030424202871504... (sequence A085291 in the OEIS).

The exact value of the constant can be written as the exponential of a certain infinite series. Explicitly,
$$\lim_{n\to\infty} \alpha(n) = e^{c-1} \approx 0.80939402,$$
where $c$ is given by
$$c = \sum_{k=2}^\infty \frac{1}{k} \ln \frac{k}{k-1} \approx 0.78853057.$$
This sum can alternatively be expressed as follows, writing $\zeta(n)$ for the Riemann zeta function:
$$c = \sum_{n=1}^\infty \frac{\zeta(n+1)-1}{n}.$$
This series for the constant $c$ converges more rapidly than the one before. The function $m(n)$ is constant over stretches of $n$, but jumps from 5 to 7, skipping the value 6. Erdős raised the question of how large the gaps in the sequence of $m(n)$ can grow, and how long the constant stretches can be.
