= Marius Brülhart =

Swiss economist

Academic background
- Education: University of Fribourg; Trinity College Dublin

Academic work
- Discipline: Economics
- Institutions: University of Lausanne

Marius Brülhart is a Swiss economist and professor of economics at the University of Lausanne. He is the Editor-in-Chief of the Swiss Journal of Economics and Statistics.

== Career ==
Brülhart earned his undergraduate economics degree from the University of Fribourg in 1991, and his Ph.D. in economics from Trinity College Dublin in 1996. He subsequently worked as a junior professor at Trinity College Dublin, the University of Manchester and the University of Lausanne. In 2002, he was appointed as a full professor at the Faculty of Business and Economics (HEC Lausanne) of the University of Lausanne.

Brülhart is a Research Fellow of CEPR, a member of the editorial board of the Journal of Urban Economics and the Journal of Economic Geography. He has advised a number of policy-making organizations, including the World Bank, the European Commission, the OECD, and numerous Swiss government bodies. Between 2009 and 2021, he had chaired the scientific advisory council of the liberal think tank Avenir Suisse. During the COVID-19 pandemic, he was a member of the Swiss National Covid-19 Science Taskforce, whose economics group he chaired in 2021. In 2022, he took over as Editor-in-Chief of the Swiss Journal of Economics and Statistics.

== Research ==
Brülhart is an empirical economist with broad research interests. His Google Scholar h-index stands at 42. In his Ph.D. work, he contributed to the measurement of intra-industry trade (IIT), mainly by developing an index of marginal IIT that has become the standard measure of changes in two-way international trade. In the 2000s, he focused on topics in economic geography, including the measurement of industry-level spatial concentration, growth-effects of country-level agglomeration patterns, impacts of industrial agglomeration on local taxation, and local economic effects of trade liberalization.

More recently, Brülhart's research has shifted towards public finance, working on vertical tax externalities, on inheritance tax competition, wealth taxes, and local income taxation. During the COVID-19 pandemic, Brülhart and his coauthors pioneered the use helpline data as a real-time measure of population-level mental and social distress.
