= Pietro Balestra (economist) =

Swiss economist (1935–2005)

- Born: April 2, 1935
- Died: June 23, 2005 (aged 70)

Academic background
- Education: University of Fribourg (B.A.); Stanford University (Ph.D., 1965)
- Doctoral advisor: Marc Nerlove

Academic work
- Discipline: Econometrics
- Institutions: University of Geneva; University of Fribourg; University of Lugano; University of Dijon
- Notable ideas: the econometrics of panel data

Pietro Balestra (April 2, 1935 – June 23, 2005) was a Swiss economist specializing in econometrics. He was born in Lugano and earned a B.A. in economics from the University of Fribourg. Balestra moved for graduate work to the University of Kansas (M.A in Economics) and Stanford University. He was awarded the Ph.D. in Economics by Stanford University in 1965.

Balestra returned to Switzerland as Professor of Economics and Econometrics at the University of Fribourg. He was also Associate Professor of Economics at the University of Dijon. In 1980 he was called to chair the Department of Econometrics at the University of Geneva.

Balestra continued to be active in his retirement years. He taught at the University of Lugano until his death.

Balestra is noted for his contributions to the econometrics of dynamic error components models, in particular for the generalized least squares estimator known as the Balestra–Nerlove estimator. Balestra was one of the initiators of the foundation of the University of Lugano. His outside connections were critical in gathering support from the Swiss science council. He was the first dean of the faculty of economics.

As the first treasurer of the European Economic Association, Balestra was instrumental in gathering financial support for this Pan-European scientific society.

== Honours ==
- Fellow the Econometric Society
- Fellow of the Journal of Econometrics
- President of the Swiss Society of Economics and Statistics

== Major publications ==
- Balestra, Pietro; Nerlove, Marc (July 1966). "Pooling Cross-Section and Time Series Data in the Estimation of Dynamic Models: The Demand for Natural Gas". Econometrica. 34 (3): 585–612. doi:10.2307/1909771. JSTOR 1909771.
- The Demand for Natural Gas in the United States. A Dynamic Approach for the Residential and Commercial Market. Amsterdam. 1967.
- "On the Efficiency of Ordinary Least Squares in Regression Models". Journal of the American Economic Association. September 1970.
- "Some Optimal Aspects in a Two Class Growth Model with a Differentiated Interest Rate". Kyklos. 2. (with Mauro Baranzini). 1971.
- Calcul Matriciel pour Economistes. Albeuve. 1972.
- "Best Quadratic Unbiased Estimators of the Variance-Covariance Matrix in Normal Regression". Journal of Econometrics. March 1973.
- La derivation matricielle. Paris. 1976.
- "A Note on the Exact Transformation Associated with the First Order Moving Average Process". Journal of Econometrics. December 1980.
- "A Note on Amemiya's Partially Generalised Least Squares". Journal of Econometrics. 23. 1983.
- Balestra, Pietro; Varadharajan-Krishnakumar, Jayalakshmi (1987). "Full Information Estimation of a System of Simultaneous Equations with Error Component Structure". Econometric Theory. 3 (2). (with J. Varadharajan-Krishnakumar): 223–246. doi:10.1017/s0266466600010318. S2CID 73522268.
- Aigner, Dennis J.; Balestra, Pietro (1988). "Optimal Experimental Design for Error Components Models". Econometrica. 56 (4). (with Dennis Aigner): 955–971. doi:10.2307/1912706. JSTOR 1912706.
- Matyas, L.; Sevestre, P., eds. (1992). "Formulation and Estimation of Econometric Models for Panel Data". The Econometrics of Panel Data. (with Marc Nerlove). Amsterdam.
