= Annamaria Lusardi =

Italian economist

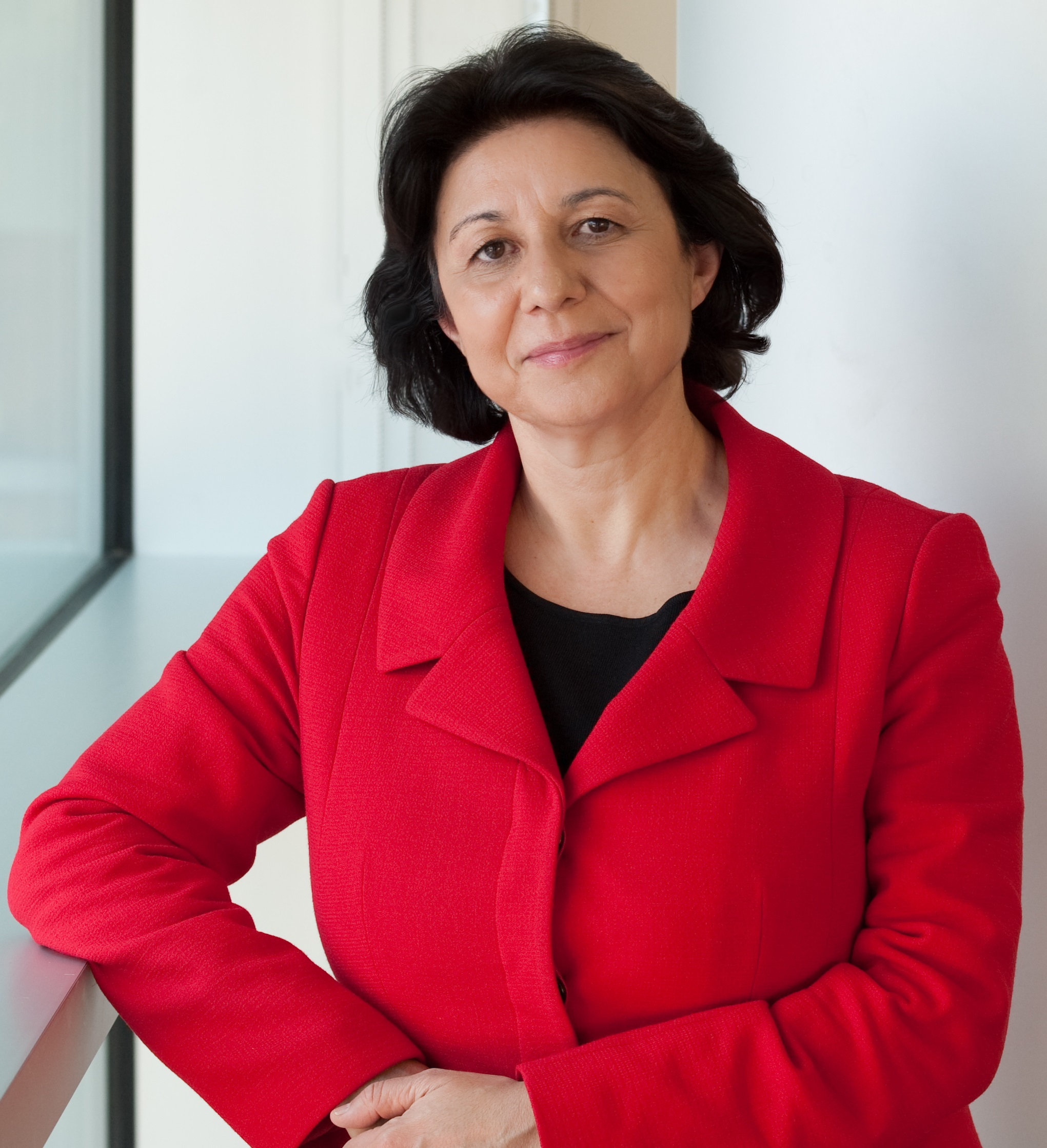
- Annamaria Lusardi in 2013
- Born: Italy

Academic background
- Education: Princeton University; Bocconi University

Academic work
- Discipline: Financial literacy
- Institutions: Stanford University

Annamaria Lusardi is an Italian-born economist and the Denit Trust Distinguished Scholar and Professor of Economics and Accountancy at Stanford University School of Business. In 2011 she founded and serves as the Academic Director of the Global Financial Literacy Excellence Center. Her interests focus on financial literacy and financial education. As of early 2025, she was also a non-resident fellow at Bruegel.

== Education ==
Annamaria Lusardi studied at Bocconi University, located in Milan, Italy. In 1986 she graduated with a BA in economics. She earned a PhD in economics in 1992 at Princeton University.

== Career ==
After graduating from Princeton, Lusardi taught economics at Princeton University, the University of Chicago Harris School of Public Policy, the University of Chicago Booth School of Business, and Columbia Business School. She also taught at Dartmouth College since 1992 as an Associate Professor of Economics. In 2006, Lusardi became a Professor Economics at Dartmouth. From 2009 to 2019, she was the Joel Z. and Susan Hyatt Professor of Economics at Dartmouth. In 2010, Lusardi began working at the George Washington School of Business where she is a chair professor. Since 2014, Lusardi has served as the Denit Trust Distinguished Scholar and Professor of Economics and Accountancy at the School of Business. Lusardi is the director of the George Washington University Financial Literacy Center, a joint initiative between Dartmouth College, the RAND corporation, and the Wharton School. In 2014 she was elected chair of the Research Committee of the Organization for Economic Co-operation and Development/International Network on Financial Education.

While Lusardi is an economist by training, she views economics as the foundational discipline underpinning personal finance, with personal finance representing a specialized application of economic principles focused on individual decision-making and financial well-being.

Lusardi served as the faculty advisor to the office of Financial Education of the U.S. Treasury from September to December in 2009. Additionally, Lusardi testified to the lack of financial capability and literacy among Americans and the necessity of financial education in high schools before the U.S. Subcommittee on Children and Families of the Senate Committee on Health, Education, Labor, and Pensions. Italy also sought Lusardi's advice. In 2017, Lusardi was appointed as the director of the Committee for Financial Education.

== Awards and honors ==
In 2013, Lusardi received the William E. Odom Visionary Leadership Award from the Jump$tart Coalition for Personal Financial Literacy, and the National Numeracy Network's inaugural 2012 Steen Award. She is the recipient of the Fidelity Pyramid Prize, a $50,000 award to authors of published applied research that best helps address the goal of improving lifelong financial well-being for Americans. The University of Vaasa (Finland) awarded her an honorary degree of Economics and Business Administration in 2019. She has also received awards or scholarships from FINRA, SABE, Skandia and Williams A. Forbes.

== Selected publications ==
- Lusardi, Annamaria; Mitchell, Olivia S. (March 2014). "The Economic Importance of Financial Literacy: Theory and Evidence". Journal of Economic Literature. 52 (1): 5–44. doi:10.1257/jel.52.1.5. PMC 5450829. PMID 28579637.
- van Rooij, Maarten; Lusardi, Annamaria; Alessie, Rob (May 2012). "Financial Literacy, Retirement Planning and Household Wealth" (PDF). The Economic Journal. 122 (560): 449–478. doi:10.1111/j.1468-0297.2012.02501.x. S2CID 59069723.
- Lusardi, Annamaria; Mitchell, Olivia S. (October 2011). "Financial Literacy Around the World". Journal of Pension Economics and Finance. 10 (4): 497–508. doi:10.1017/s1474747211000448. PMC 5445931. PMID 28553190.
- Lusardi, Annamaria; Schneider, Daniel; Tufano, Peter (Spring 2011). "Financially Fragile Households: Evidence and Implications" (PDF). Brookings Papers on Economic Activity. 2011: 83–134. doi:10.1353/eca.2011.0002. S2CID 201776048. Archived from the original (PDF) on 2013-05-31.
- van Rooij, Maarten; Lusardi, Annamaria; Alessie, Rob (2011). "Financial Literacy and Stock Market Participation". Journal of Financial Economics. 101 (2): 449–472. CiteSeerX 10.1.1.1026.5760. doi:10.1016/j.jfineco.2011.03.006. S2CID 206041071.
- Hurst, Erik; Lusardi, Annamaria; Kennickell, Arthur; Torralba, Francisco (February 2011). "The Importance of Business Owners in Assessing the Size of Precautionary Savings". Review of Economics and Statistics. 92: 61–69. doi:10.1162/rest.2009.11500. S2CID 17956622.
- Lusardi, Annamaria; Mitchell, Olivia S. (May 2008). "Planning and Financial Literacy: How Do Women Fare?" (PDF). The American Economic Review. 92 (2): 413–417. doi:10.1257/aer.98.2.413.
- Lusardi, Annamaria; Mitchell, Olivia S. (January 2007). "Baby Boomer Retirement Security: The Role of Planning, Financial Literacy, and Housing Wealth" (PDF). Journal of Monetary Economics. 54: 205–224. doi:10.1016/j.jmoneco.2006.12.001. S2CID 1823819.(Awarded the Fidelity Pyramid Prize.)
- Hurst, Erik; Lusardi, Annamaria (April 2004). "Liquidity Constraints, Household Wealth, and Entrepreneurship". Journal of Political Economy. 112 (2): 319–347. doi:10.1086/381478. S2CID 154628695.
- Lusardi, Annamaria (May 1998). "On the Importance of the Precautionary Saving Motive". The American Economic Review. 88 (2): 449–453. JSTOR 116965.
- Browning, Martin; Lusardi, Annamaria (December 1996). "Household Savings: Micro Theories and Micro Facts" (PDF). Journal of Economic Literature. 34: 1797–1855.
- Lusardi, Annamaria (January 1996). "Permanent Income, Current Income and Consumption: Evidence from Two Panel Data Sets". Journal of Business and Economic Statistics. 14 (1): 81–90. doi:10.2307/1392101. JSTOR 1392101.
- Lusardi, Annamaria (January 2019). "Financial literacy and the need for financial education: evidence and implications". Swiss Journal of Economics and Statistics. 155 (1): 1–8. doi:10.1186/s41937-019-0027-5. hdl:10419/259733. S2CID 169986432.
- Lusardi, Annamaria (April 2015). "Financial Literacy: Do People Know the ABCs of Finance?" (PDF). Public Understanding of Science. 24 (3): 260–271. doi:10.1177/0963662514564516. PMID 25838273. S2CID 27224952.
- Lusardi, Annamaria (March 2015). "Risk Literacy". Italian Economic Journal. 1 (1): 5–23. doi:10.1007/s40797-015-0011-x. hdl:10.1007/s40797-015-0011-x. S2CID 189935847.
