= Edmund Wilhelm Milliet =

Swiss statistician (1857–1931)

- Born: 1 November 1857; Basel, Switzerland
- Died: 16 April 1931 (aged 73); Bern, Switzerland
- Occupations: Statistician, civil servant

Edmund Wilhelm Milliet (1 November 1857 – 16 April 1931) was a Swiss statistician and civil servant who served as the first director of the Federal Alcohol Board from 1888 to 1922.

== Biography ==
Milliet was born on 1 November 1857 in Basel, the son of Louis Friedrich and Hanna Groobey, an Englishwoman. He acquired citizenship of Basel in 1878. He married Marie Louise Grieder, and later Rosina Elisabeth Zimmermann.

After attending the commercial school in Basel, Milliet completed an internship at a bank in 1873. He served as executive secretary of the Swiss Central Railway company from 1874 to 1883 while simultaneously studying political economy and law at the University of Basel.

== Career ==
Milliet was appointed deputy (1883–1885) and then director (1886–1889) of the Federal Statistical Office. Having made a name for himself as a statistician by helping prepare the 1887 federal law on alcohol, he became the first director of the newly created Federal Alcohol Board (1888–1922) and was recognized as a specialist both in Switzerland and abroad. He served as honorary professor of national economy at the University of Bern from 1910 to 1929.

He was president (1913–1919) and honorary president (1924) of the Swiss Statistical Society, and received an honorary doctorate from the faculty of law of the University of Bern in 1908. He died on 16 April 1931 in Bern.

== Bibliography ==
- Der Bund, 1 November 1927; 17 April 1931
- NZZ, 24 March 1931
- F. Hagmann, 100 Jahre Eidgenössisches Statistisches Amt, 1960, pp. 7–8
