= Kummer's theorem =

Theorem on powers of primes dividing binomial coefficients

In mathematics, Kummer's theorem is a formula for the exponent of the highest power of a prime number p that divides a given binomial coefficient. In other words, it gives the p-adic valuation of a binomial coefficient. The theorem is named after Ernst Kummer, who proved it in 1852 (Kummer 1852).

== Statement ==
Kummer's theorem states that for given integers n ≥ m ≥ 0 and a prime number p, the p-adic valuation $\nu_p\!\tbinom n m$ of the binomial coefficient $\tbinom{n}{m}$ is equal to the number of carries when m is added to n − m in base p.

An equivalent formation of the theorem is as follows:

Write the base-$p$ expansion of the integer $n$ as $n=n_0+n_1p+n_2p^2+\cdots+n_rp^r$, and define $S_p(n):=n_0+n_1+\cdots+n_r$ to be the sum of the base-$p$ digits. Then

$$\nu_p\!\binom nm  = \dfrac{S_p(m) + S_p(n-m) - S_p(n)}{p-1}.$$

The theorem can be proved by writing $\tbinom{n}{m}$ as $\tfrac{n!}{m! (n-m)!}$ and using Legendre's formula.

=== Examples ===
To compute the largest power of 2 dividing the binomial coefficient $\tbinom{10}{3}$ write m = 3 and n − m = 7 in base p = 2 as 3 = 11_{2} and 7 = 111_{2}. Carrying out the addition 11_{2} + 111_{2} = 1010_{2} in base 2 requires three carries:

$$\begin{array}{ccccc}
& _1 & _1 & _1 \\
& & & 1 & 1 \,_2 \\
+ & & 1 & 1 & 1 \,_2 \\\hline
& 1 & 0 & 1 & 0 \,_2
\end{array}$$

Therefore the largest power of 2 that divides $\tbinom{10}{3} = 120 = 2^3 \cdot 15$ is 3.

Alternatively, the form involving sums of digits can be used. The sums of digits of 3, 7, and 10 in base 2 are $S_2(3) = 1 + 1 = 2$, $S_2(7) = 1 + 1 + 1 = 3$, and $S_2(10) = 1 + 0 + 1 + 0 = 2$ respectively. Then

$$\nu_2\!\binom {10}3  = \dfrac{S_2(3) + S_2(7) - S_2(10)}{2 - 1} = \dfrac{2 + 3 - 2}{2 - 1} = 3.$$

== Multinomial coefficient generalization ==
Kummer's theorem can be generalized to multinomial coefficients $\tbinom n {m_1,\ldots,m_k} = \tfrac{n!}{m_1!\cdots m_k!}$ as follows:

$$\nu_p\!\binom n {m_1,\ldots,m_k} = \dfrac{1}{p-1} \left(\left(\sum_{i=1}^k S_p(m_i) \right) - S_p(n) \right).$$

== See also ==
- Lucas's theorem
