= Barnes G-function =

Extension of superfactorials to the complex numbers

Plot of the Barnes G aka double gamma function G(z) in the complex plane from -2-2i to 2+2i with colors created with Mathematica 13.1 function ComplexPlot3D

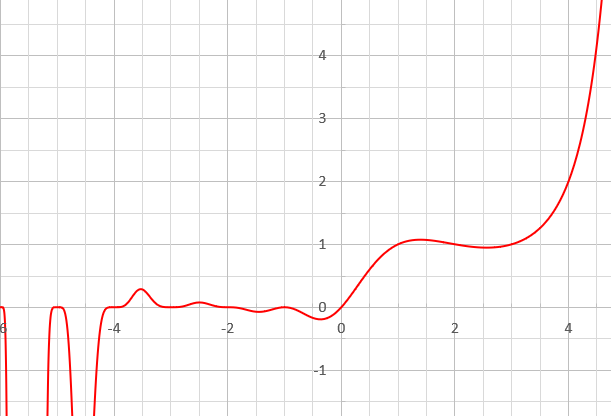
The Barnes G function along part of the real axis

In mathematics, the Barnes G-function $G(z)$ is a function that is an extension of superfactorials to the complex numbers. It is related to the gamma function, the K-function and the Glaisher–Kinkelin constant, and was named after mathematician Ernest William Barnes. It can be written in terms of the double gamma function.

Formally, the Barnes G-function is defined in the following Weierstrass product form:

$$G(1+z)=(2\pi)^{z/2} \exp\left(- \frac{z+z^2(1+\gamma)}{2} \right) \, \prod_{k=1}^\infty \left\{ \left(1+\frac{z}{k}\right)^k \exp\left(\frac{z^2}{2k}-z\right) \right\}$$

where $\gamma \approx 0.5772$ is the Euler–Mascheroni constant, $\exp(x) = e^x$ is the exponential function, and $\Pi$ denotes multiplication (capital pi notation).

The integral representation, which may be deduced from the relation to the double gamma function, is

$$\log G(1+z) = \frac{z}{2}\log(2\pi) +\int_0^\infty\frac{dt}{t}\left[\frac{1-e^{-zt}}{4\sinh^2\frac{t}{2}} +\frac{z^2}{2}e^{-t} -\frac{z}{t}\right]$$

As an entire function, $G$ is of order two, and of infinite type. This can be deduced from the asymptotic expansion given below.

== Functional equation and integer arguments ==
The Barnes G-function satisfies the functional equation

$$G(z+1)=\Gamma(z)\, G(z)$$

with normalization $G(1)=1$. Note the similarity between the functional equation of the Barnes G-function and that of the Euler gamma function:

$$\Gamma(z+1)=z \, \Gamma(z) .$$

The functional equation implies that $G$ takes the following values at integer arguments:

$$G(n)=\begin{cases} 0&\text{if }n=0,-1,-2,\dots\\ \prod_{i=0}^{n-2} i!&\text{if }n=1,2,\dots\end{cases}$$

In particular, $G(0)=0, G(1) = 1$ and $G(n) = sf(n-2)$ for $n \geq 1$, where $sf$ is the superfactorial.

and thus

$$G(n)=\frac{(\Gamma(n))^{n-1}}{K(n)}$$

where $\,\Gamma(x)$ denotes the gamma function and $K$ denotes the K-function. In general,
$$K(z) G(z)=e^{(z-1) \ln \Gamma(z)}$$
for all complex $z$.

The functional equation $G(z+1)=\Gamma(z)\, G(z)$ uniquely defines the Barnes G-function if the convexity condition,

$$(\forall x \geq 1) \, \frac{\mathrm{d}^3}{\mathrm{d}x^3}\log(G(x))\geq 0$$

is added. Additionally, the Barnes G-function satisfies the duplication formula,

$$G(x)G\left(x+\frac{1}{2}\right)^{2}G(x+1)=e^{\frac{1}{4}}A^{-3}2^{-2x^{2}+3x-\frac{11}{12}}\pi^{x-\frac{1}{2}}G\left(2x\right)$$,

where $A$ is the Glaisher–Kinkelin constant.

== Characterisation ==
Similar to the Bohr–Mollerup theorem for the gamma function, for a constant $c>0$ we have for $f(x)=cG(x)$

$f(x+1)=\Gamma(x)f(x)$

and for $x>0$

$f(x+n)\sim \Gamma(x)^nn^{{x\choose 2}}f(n)$

as $n\to\infty$.

== Reflection formula ==
The difference equation for the G-function, in conjunction with the functional equation for the gamma function, can be used to obtain the following reflection formula for the Barnes G-function (originally proved by Hermann Kinkelin):

$$\log G(1-z) = \log G(1+z)-z\log 2\pi+ \int_0^z \pi x \cot \pi x \, dx.$$

The log-tangent integral on the right-hand side can be evaluated in terms of the Clausen function (of order 2) when $0 < z < 1$, as is shown below:

$$2\pi \log\left( \frac{G(1-z)}{G(1+z)} \right)= 2\pi z\log\left(\frac{\sin\pi z}{\pi} \right) + \operatorname{Cl}_2(2\pi z)$$

The proof of this result hinges on the following evaluation of the cotangent integral: introducing the notation $\operatorname{Lc}(z)$ for the log-cotangent integral, and using the fact that $\,(d/dx) \log(\sin\pi x)=\pi\cot\pi x$, an integration by parts gives

$$\begin{align}
\operatorname{Lc}(z) &= \int_0^z\pi x\cot \pi x\,dx \\
&= z\log(\sin \pi z)-\int_0^z\log(\sin \pi x)\,dx \\
&= z\log(\sin \pi z)-\int_0^z\Bigg[\log(2\sin \pi x)-\log 2\Bigg]\,dx \\
&= z\log(2\sin \pi z)-\int_0^z\log(2\sin \pi x)\,dx .
\end{align}$$

Performing the integral substitution $\, y=2\pi x \Rightarrow dx=dy/(2\pi)$ gives

$$z\log(2\sin \pi z)-\frac{1}{2\pi}\int_0^{2\pi z}\log\left(2\sin \frac{y}{2} \right)\,dy.$$

The Clausen function – of second order – has the integral representation

$$\operatorname{Cl}_2(\theta) = -\int_0^{\theta}\log\Bigg|2\sin \frac{x}{2} \Bigg|\,dx.$$

However, within the interval $\, 0 < \theta < 2\pi$, the absolute value sign within the integrand can be omitted, since within the range the 'half-sine' function in the integral is strictly positive, and strictly non-zero. Comparing this definition with the result above for the log-tangent integral, the following relation clearly holds:

$$\operatorname{Lc}(z)=z\log(2\sin \pi z)+\frac{1}{2\pi} \operatorname{Cl}_2(2\pi z).$$

Thus, after a slight rearrangement of terms, the proof is complete:

$$2\pi \log\left( \frac{G(1-z)}{G(1+z)} \right)= 2\pi z\log\left(\frac{\sin\pi z}{\pi} \right)+\operatorname{Cl}_2(2\pi z)$$

Using the relation $\, G(1+z)=\Gamma(z)\, G(z)$ and dividing the reflection formula by a factor of $\, 2\pi$ gives the equivalent form:

$$\log\left( \frac{G(1-z)}{G(z)} \right)= z\log\left(\frac{\sin\pi z}{\pi}
\right)+\log\Gamma(z)+\frac{1}{2\pi}\operatorname{Cl}_2(2\pi z)$$

Adamchik (2003) has given an equivalent form of the reflection formula, but with a different proof.

Replacing $z$ with $1/2 - z$ in the previous reflection formula gives, after some simplification, the equivalent formula shown below

(involving Bernoulli polynomials):

$$\log\left( \frac{ G\left(\frac{1}{2}+z\right) }{ G\left(\frac{1}{2}-z\right) } \right) = \log \Gamma \left(\frac{1}{2}-z \right) + B_1(z) \log 2\pi+\frac{1}{2}\log 2+\pi \int_0^z B_1(x) \tan \pi x \,dx$$

== Taylor series expansion ==
By Taylor's theorem, and considering the logarithmic derivatives of the Barnes function, the following series expansion can be obtained:

$$\log G(1+z) = \frac{z}{2}\log 2\pi -\left( \frac{z+(1+\gamma)z^2}{2} \right) + \sum_{k=2}^{\infty}(-1)^k\frac{\zeta(k)}{k+1}z^{k+1}.$$

It is valid for $\, 0 < z < 1$. Here, $\, \zeta(x)$ is the Riemann zeta function:

$$\zeta(s)=\sum_{n=1}^{\infty}\frac{1}{n^s}.$$

Exponentiating both sides of the Taylor expansion gives:

$$\begin{align} G(1+z) &= \exp \left[ \frac{z}{2}\log 2\pi -\left( \frac{z+(1+\gamma)z^2}{2} \right) + \sum_{k=2}^{\infty}(-1)^k\frac{\zeta(k)}{k+1}z^{k+1} \right] \\
&=(2\pi)^{z/2}\exp\left[ -\frac{z+(1+\gamma)z^2}{2} \right] \exp \left[\sum_{k=2}^{\infty}(-1)^k\frac{\zeta(k)}{k+1}z^{k+1} \right].\end{align}$$

Comparing this with the Weierstrass product form of the Barnes function gives the following relation:

$$\exp \left[\sum_{k=2}^\infty (-1)^k\frac{\zeta(k)}{k+1}z^{k+1} \right] = \prod_{k=1}^{\infty} \left\{ \left(1+\frac{z}{k}\right)^k \exp \left(\frac{z^2}{2k}-z\right) \right\}$$

== Multiplication formula ==
Like the gamma function, the G-function also has a multiplication formula:

$$G(nz)= K(n) n^{n^{2}z^{2}/2-nz} (2\pi)^{-\frac{n^2-n}{2}z}\prod_{i=0}^{n-1}\prod_{j=0}^{n-1}G\left(z+\frac{i+j}{n}\right)$$

where $K(n)$ is a constant given by:

$$K(n)= e^{-(n^2-1)\zeta^\prime(-1)} \cdot
n^{\frac{5}{12}}\cdot(2\pi)^{(n-1)/2}\,=\,
(Ae^{-\frac{1}{12}})^{n^2-1}\cdot n^{\frac{5}{12}}\cdot (2\pi)^{(n-1)/2}.$$

Here $\zeta^\prime$ is the derivative of the Riemann zeta function and $A$ is the Glaisher–Kinkelin constant.

== Absolute value ==
It holds true that $G(\overline z)=\overline{G(z)}$, thus $|G(z)|^2=G(z)G(\overline z)$. From this relation and by the above presented Weierstrass product form one can show that

$$|G(x+iy)|=|G(x)|\exp\left(y^2\frac{1+\gamma}{2}\right)\sqrt{1+\frac{y^2}{x^2}}\sqrt{\prod_{k=1}^\infty\left(1+\frac{y^2}{(x+k)^2}\right)^{k+1}\exp\left(-\frac{y^2}{k}\right)}.$$

This relation is valid for arbitrary $x\in\mathbb{R}\setminus\{0,-1,-2,\dots\}$, and $y\in\mathbb{R}$. If $x=0$, then the below formula is valid instead:

$$|G(iy)|=y\exp\left(y^2\frac{1+\gamma}{2}\right)\sqrt{\prod_{k=1}^\infty\left(1+\frac{y^2}{k^2}\right)^{k+1}\exp\left(-\frac{y^2}{k}\right)}$$

for arbitrary real y.

== Asymptotic expansion ==
The logarithm of G(z + 1) has the following asymptotic expansion, as established by Barnes:

$$\begin{align}
\log G(z+1) = {} & \frac{z^2}{2} \log z - \frac{3z^2}{4} + \frac{z}{2}\log 2\pi -\frac{1}{12} \log z \\
& {} + \left(\frac{1}{12}-\log A \right)
+\sum_{k=1}^N \frac{B_{2k + 2}}{4k\left(k + 1\right)z^{2k}}~+~O\left(\frac{1}{z^{2N + 2}}\right).
\end{align}$$

Here the $B_k$ are the Bernoulli numbers and $A$ is the Glaisher–Kinkelin constant. (Note that somewhat confusingly at the time of Barnes the Bernoulli number $B_{2k}$ would have been written as $(-1)^{k+1} B_k$, but this convention is no longer current.) This expansion is valid for $z$ in any sector not containing the negative real axis with $|z|$ large.

== Relation to the log-gamma integral ==
The parametric log-gamma can be evaluated in terms of the Barnes G-function:

$$\int_0^z \log \Gamma(x)\,dx=\frac{z(1-z)}{2}+\frac{z}{2}\log 2\pi +(z-1)\log\Gamma(z) -\log G(z)$$

A proof of the formula

The proof is somewhat indirect, and involves first considering the logarithmic difference of the gamma function and Barnes G-function:

$$z\log \Gamma(z)-\log G(1+z)$$

where

$$\frac{1}{\Gamma(z)}= z e^{\gamma z} \prod_{k=1}^\infty \left\{ \left(1+\frac{z}{k}\right)e^{-z/k} \right\}$$

and $\,\gamma$ is the Euler–Mascheroni constant.

Taking the logarithm of the Weierstrass product forms of the Barnes G-function and gamma function gives:

$$\begin{align}
& z\log \Gamma(z)-\log G(1+z)=-z \log\left(\frac{1}{\Gamma (z)}\right)-\log G(1+z) \\[5pt]
= {} & {-z} \left[ \log z+\gamma z +\sum_{k=1}^\infty \Bigg\{ \log\left(1+\frac{z}{k} \right) -\frac{z}{k} \Bigg\} \right] \\[5pt]
& {} -\left[ \frac{z}{2}\log 2\pi -\frac{z}{2}-\frac{z^2}{2} -\frac{z^2 \gamma}{2} + \sum_{k=1}^\infty \Bigg\{k\log\left(1+\frac{z}{k}\right) +\frac{z^2}{2k} -z \Bigg\} \right]
\end{align}$$

A little simplification and re-ordering of terms gives the series expansion:

$$\begin{align}
& \sum_{k=1}^\infty \Bigg\{ (k+z)\log \left(1+\frac{z}{k}\right)-\frac{z^2}{2k}-z \Bigg\} \\[5pt]
= {} & {-z}\log z-\frac{z}{2}\log 2\pi +\frac{z}{2} +\frac{z^2}{2}- \frac{z^2 \gamma}{2}- z\log\Gamma(z) +\log G(1+z)
\end{align}$$

Finally, take the logarithm of the Weierstrass product form of the gamma function, and integrate over the interval $\, [0,\,z]$ to obtain:

$$\begin{align}
& \int_0^z\log\Gamma(x)\,dx=-\int_0^z \log\left(\frac{1}{\Gamma(x)}\right)\,dx \\[5pt]
= {} & {-(z\log z-z)}-\frac{z^2 \gamma}{2}- \sum_{k=1}^\infty \Bigg\{ (k+z)\log \left(1+\frac{z}{k}\right)-\frac{z^2}{2k}-z \Bigg\}
\end{align}$$

Equating the two evaluations completes the proof:

$$\int_0^z \log \Gamma(x)\,dx=\frac{z(1-z)}{2}+\frac{z}{2}\log 2\pi +z\log\Gamma(z) -\log G(1+z)$$

And since $\, G(1+z)=\Gamma(z)\, G(z)$ then,

$$\int_0^z \log \Gamma(x)\,dx=\frac{z(1-z)}{2}+\frac{z}{2}\log 2\pi -(1-z)\log\Gamma(z) -\log G(z)\, .$$

Taking the logarithm of both sides introduces the analog of the Digamma function $\psi(x)$,

$\varphi(x) \equiv \frac{d}{dx}\log G(x),$

where

$$\varphi(x) =(x-1)[\psi(x)-1]+\varphi(1),\quad \varphi(1)=\frac{\ln(2\pi)-1}{2}$$

with Taylor series

$$\varphi(x)=\varphi(1)-(\gamma+1)(x-1)+\sum_{k\ge 2}(-1)^k\zeta(k)(x-1)^k .$$
