= Julia Mangold =

German artist

Julia Mangold (born 1966) is a German artist.

Her work is included in the collections of the Museum of Fine Arts Houston and the Museum of Modern Art, New York.
