= Superfactorial =

Product of consecutive factorial numbers

In mathematics, and more specifically number theory, the superfactorial of a positive integer $n$ is the product of the first $n$ factorials. They are a special case of the Jordan–Pólya numbers, which are products of arbitrary collections of factorials.

== Definition ==
The $n$th superfactorial $\mathit{sf}(n)$ may be defined as:
$$\begin{align}
\mathit{sf}(n) &= 1!\cdot 2!\cdot \cdots n! = \prod_{i=1}^{n} i! = n!\cdot\mathit{sf}(n-1)\\
&= 1^n \cdot 2^{n-1} \cdot \cdots n = \prod_{i=1}^{n} i^{n+1-i}\\
&=\frac{(n!)^{n+1}}{\prod_{i=1}^{n} i^{i}} = \frac{(n!)^{n+1}}{H(n)}
\end{align}$$
where $H$ is the hyperfactorial.

Following the usual convention for the empty product, the superfactorial of 0 is 1. The sequence of superfactorials, beginning with $\mathit{sf}(0)=1$, is:

1, 1, 2, 12, 288, 34560, 24883200, 125411328000, 5056584744960000, ... (sequence A000178 in the OEIS)

== Properties ==
Just as the factorials can be continuously interpolated by the gamma function, the superfactorials can be continuously interpolated by the Barnes G-function as $sf(n) = G(n+2)$ for all nonnegative integers.

According to an analogue of Wilson's theorem on the behavior of factorials modulo prime numbers, when $p$ is an odd prime number
$$\mathit{sf}(p-1)\equiv(p-1)!!\pmod{p},$$
where $!!$ is the notation for the double factorial.

For every integer $k$, the number $\mathit{sf}(4k)/(2k)!$ is a square number. This may be expressed as stating that, in the formula for $\mathit{sf}(4k)$ as a product of factorials, omitting one of the factorials (the middle one, $(2k)!$) results in a square product. Additionally, if any $n+1$ integers are given, the product of their pairwise differences is always a multiple of $\mathit{sf}(n)$, and equals the superfactorial when the given numbers are consecutive.
