= Hermann Kinkelin =

Swiss mathematician and politician

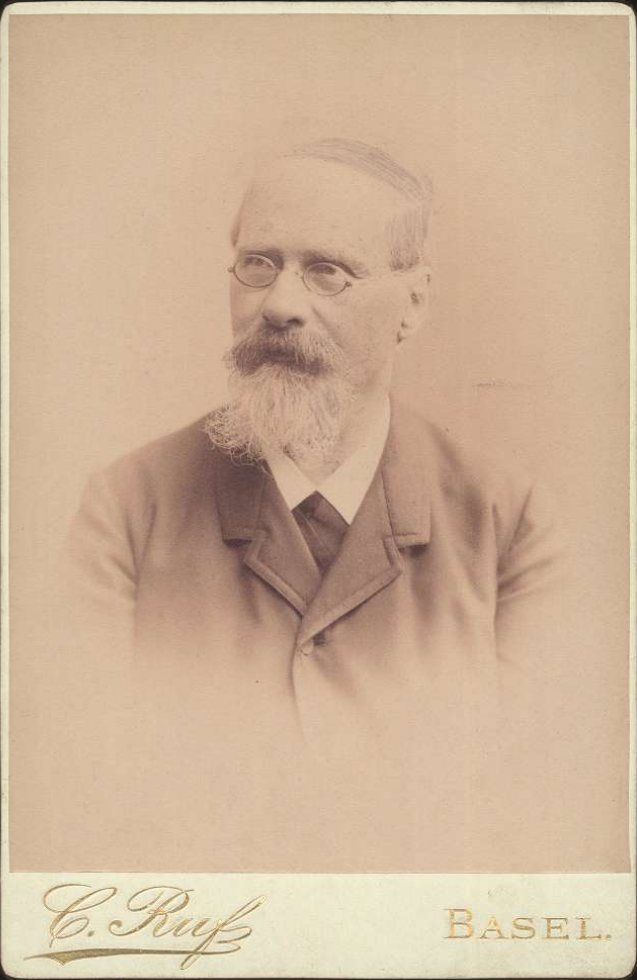
- Hermann Kinkelin
- Born: 11 November 1832; Bern
- Died: 1 January 1913 (aged 80); Basel
- Known for: Glaisher–Kinkelin constant
- Scientific career
- Fields: Mathematics
- Workplaces: University of Basel; Swiss Statistical Society SSS; Statistical-economic society

Hermann Kinkelin (11 November 1832 – 1 January 1913) was a Swiss mathematician and politician.

== Life ==
His family came from Lindau on Lake Constance. He studied at the Universities of Zurich, Lausanne, and Munich. In 1865 he became professor of mathematics at the University of Basel, where until his retirement in 1908, the full burden of teaching of mathematics was his responsibility. In 1867 he was naturalized in Basel. He was also a statistician, he founded the Swiss Statistical Society and the Statistical-economic society in Basel and led the 1870 and 1880 Federal census in Basel.

Kinkelin's works dealt with the gamma function, infinite series, and solid geometry of the axonometric. Kinkelin produced more than 60 publications in actuarial mathematics and statistics. He was a founder of the Basel "mortality and age checkout" (later "Patria, Swiss life insurance company Mutual") and the Swiss Statistical Society, of which he was a member during 1877–86.

Hermann Kinkelin died in Basel on 1 January 1913.

== Publications ==
- Investigation into the formula $\scriptstyle n F(n x) = f(x) + f(x + \frac{1}{n}) + f(x + \frac{2}{n}) + \ldots f(x + \frac{n-1}{n}).$ Archiv der Mathematik und Physik 22, 1854, pp. 189–224 (Google Books, dito)
- The fundamental equations of the Γ(x) function, Mitteilungen der Naturforschenden Gesellschaft in Bern 385 und 386, 1857, pp. 1–11 (Internet-Archiv, dito)
- On some infinite series, Mitteilungen der Naturforschenden Gesellschaft in Bern 419 und 420, 1858, pp. 89–104 ( Internet Archive)
- About a transcendent relatives of the gamma function and its application to the integral calculus, Journal für die reine und angewandte Mathematik 57, 1860, pp. 122–138 (GDZ)
- The oblique axonometric projection, Vierteljahrsschrift der Naturforschenden Gesellschaft in Zürich 6, 1861, pp. 358–367 (Google Books)
- On the Theory of Prismoides, Archiv der Mathematik und Physik 39, 1862, p. 181–186 (Google Books, dito, dito)
- Proof of three sybling expressions of the triangle, Archiv der Mathematik und Physik 39, 1862, pp. 186–188 (Google Books, dito, dito)
- New evidence of the presence complex roots in an algebraic equation, Mathematische Annalen 1, 1869, pp. 502–506 (Google Books, GDZ, Jahrbuch-Rezension)
- The calculation of the Christian Easter, Zeitschrift für Mathematik und Physik 15, 1870, pp. 217–228 (Internet-Archiv)
- Lecture in Die Basler Mathematiker Daniel Bernoulli und Leonhard Euler, Verhandlungen der Naturforschenden Gesellschaft in Basel 7 (Anhang), 1884, pp. 51–71 (Internet-Archiv)
- Constructions of the centers of curvature of conics, Zeitschrift für Mathematik und Physik 40, 1895, pp. 58–59 (Internet-Archiv, Jahrbuch-Rezension)
- About the gamma function, Verhandlungen der Naturforschenden Gesellschaft in Basel 16, 1903, pp. 309–328 (Internet-Archiv, dito)

=== Monographs ===
- General theory of harmonic series with applications to number theory, Schweighauser, Basel 1862 (Google Books)
- Short notice of the metric weights and measures, 1876; Nachdruck: Andreas Mächler, Riehen 2006, ISBN 3-905837-02-1
