= Fritz Mangold =

Swiss statistician (1871–1944)

- Born: 2 March 1871; Offenburg, Grand Duchy of Baden, German Empire
- Died: 25 March 1944 (aged 73); Basel, Switzerland
- Education: University of Basel
- Occupations: Statistician; politician; professor
- Spouse: Gertrud Müller (m. 1902)
- Parents: Reinhard Mangold (father); Maria Hoffner (mother)

Fritz Mangold (2 March 1871 – 25 March 1944) was a Swiss statistician and politician in Basel. He was the first cantonal statistician of Basel-Stadt from 1902 to 1910 and a non-party member of the cantonal government from 1910 to 1919. From 1921 to 1937 he headed the Swiss Economic Archives (Schweizerisches Wirtschaftsarchiv), and he was professor of statistics at the University of Basel, whose rector he was in 1937–1938. In Basel, and for a time also at the national level in the turbulent years after the First World War, he was one of the leading figures in social policy.

== Biography ==
Fritz Mangold was born on 2 March 1871 in Offenburg in Baden, the son of Reinhard Mangold, a master mechanic (Mechanikermeister), and Maria née Hoffner. A German citizen, he became a citizen of Basel in 1888. In 1902 he married Gertrud Müller.

Mangold attended schools in Basel. From 1888 he studied the humanities in Basel, then economics (Nationalökonomie) and statistics, and in 1899 he obtained his doctorate (Dr. phil.). From 1891 to 1902 he was a teacher and headmaster (Rektor) at the district school (Bezirksschule) in Therwil, and from 1902 to 1910 he was the first cantonal statistician (Kantonsstatistiker) of the canton of Basel-Stadt.

From 1910 to 1919 Mangold was a non-party member of the cantonal government (Regierungsrat) of Basel, in charge of the education department. He resigned because of his sympathy for the general strike (Landesstreik). From 1917 part-time, and from 1919 to 1921 full-time, he was head of the Federal Welfare Office (Eidgenössisches Fürsorgeamt) and deputy director of the Federal Office for Unemployment Welfare (Eidgenössisches Amt für Arbeitslosenfürsorge) in Bern.

From 1921 to 1937 Mangold headed the Swiss Economic Archives in Basel. At the University of Basel he was associate professor (ausserordentlicher Professor) of statistics from 1921 and full professor from 1928 to 1941, and he was rector of the university in 1937–1938. From 1939 to 1944 he headed the cantonal central office for the war economy (Kantonale Zentralstelle für Kriegswirtschaft). He died in Basel on 25 March 1944.

Influenced by the historical school of economics, Mangold was one of the leading figures in social policy in Basel and, for a time in the turbulent years after the First World War, also at the national level. He sought to integrate the working class through reforms, for which his social-statistical studies were to provide the basis.

== Bibliography ==
- Schweizerische Wirtschaftsfragen: Festgabe für Fritz Mangold, 1941 (with bibliography)
- W. Dettwiler, Fritz Mangold, licentiate thesis (Lizentiatsarbeit), Basel, 1988

=== Archives ===
- Swiss Economic Archives (Schweizerisches Wirtschaftsarchiv), Basel: personal papers (Nachlass)
