= Pseudogamma function =

Function that interpolates the factorial

In mathematics, a pseudogamma function is a function that interpolates the factorial. The gamma function is the most famous solution to the problem of extending the notion of the factorial beyond the positive integers only. However, it is clearly not the only solution, as, for any set of points, an infinite number of curves can be drawn through those points. Such a curve, namely one which interpolates the factorial but is not equal to the gamma function, is known as a pseudogamma function. The two most famous pseudogamma functions are Hadamard's gamma function,
$$H(x)=\frac{\psi\left ( 1 - \frac{x}{2}\right )-\psi\left ( \frac{1}{2} - \frac{x}{2}\right )}{2\Gamma (1-x)} = \frac{\Phi\left(-1, 1, -x\right)}{\Gamma(-x)}$$
where $\Phi$ is the Lerch zeta function, and the Luschny factorial:
$$\Gamma(x+1)\left(1-\frac{\sin\left(\pi x\right)}{\pi x}\left(\frac{x}{2}\left(\psi\left(\frac{x+1}{2}\right)-\psi\left(\frac{x}{2}\right)\right)-\frac{1}{2}\right)\right)$$
where Γ(x) denotes the classical gamma function and ψ(x) denotes the digamma function. Other related pseudogamma functions are also known.

However, by adding conditions to the function interpolating the factorial, we obtain uniqueness of this function, most often given by the Gamma function. The most common condition is the logarithmic convexity: this is the Bohr-Mollerup theorem. See also the Wielandt theorem for other conditions.
