= Mollerup =

Mollerup is a surname. Notable people with the surname include:

- Asta Mollerup (1881–1945), Danish dance teacher
- Johannes Mollerup (1872–1937), Danish mathematician
- Merete Ahnfeldt-Mollerup (born 1963), Danish architect, university professor and writer
- Per Mollerup (born 1942), Danish designer, academic, and author

== See also ==
- Bohr–Mollerup theorem
