= Elliptic gamma function =

Mathematic function

In mathematics, the elliptic gamma function is a generalization of the q-gamma function, which is itself the q-analog of the ordinary gamma function. It is closely related to a function studied by Jackson (1905), and can be expressed in terms of the triple gamma function. It is given by

$$\Gamma (z;p,q) = \prod_{m=0}^\infty \prod_{n=0}^\infty
\frac{1-p^{m+1}q^{n+1}/z}{1-p^m q^n z}.$$

It obeys several identities:

$$\Gamma(z;p,q)=\frac{1}{\Gamma(pq/z; p,q)}\,$$

$$\Gamma(pz;p,q)=\theta (z;q) \Gamma (z; p,q)\,$$

and

$$\Gamma(qz;p,q)=\theta (z;p) \Gamma (z; p,q)\,$$

where θ is the q-theta function.

When $p=0$, it essentially reduces to the infinite q-Pochhammer symbol:

$$\Gamma(z;0,q)=\frac{1}{(z;q)_\infty}.$$

== Multiplication Formula ==
Define

$$\tilde{\Gamma}(z;p,q):=\frac{(q;q)_\infty}{(p;p)_\infty}(\theta(q;p))^{1-z}\prod_{m=0}^\infty \prod_{n=0}^\infty
\frac{1-p^{m+1}q^{n+1-z}}{1-p^m q^{n+z}}.$$

Then the following formula holds with $r=q^n$ (Felder & Varchenko (2002)).

$$\tilde{\Gamma}(nz;p,q)\tilde{\Gamma}(1/n;p,r)\tilde{\Gamma}(2/n;p,r)\cdots\tilde{\Gamma}((n-1)/n;p,r)=\left(\frac{\theta(r;p)}{\theta(q;p)}\right)^{nz-1}\tilde{\Gamma}(z;p,r)\tilde{\Gamma}(z+1/n;p,r)\cdots\tilde{\Gamma}(z+(n-1)/n;p,r).$$
