= Dover Publications =

American book publisher

- Parent company: LSC Communications
- Founded: 1941; 85 years ago
- Founder: Hayward Cirker; Blanche Cirker
- Country of origin: United States
- Headquarters location: Garden City, New York
- Distribution: Self-distributed (US); F&W Media International (UK); Peribo (Australia); Intersoft (South Africa)
- Publication types: Books, sheet music
- Official website: doverpublications.com

Dover Publications, also known as Dover Books, is an American book publisher founded in 1941 by Hayward and Blanche Cirker. It primarily reissues books that are out of print from their original publishers. These are often, but not always, books in the public domain. The original published editions may be scarce or historically significant. Dover republishes these books, making them available at a significantly reduced cost.

== Classic reprints ==
Dover reprints classic works of literature, classical sheet music, and public-domain images from the 18th and 19th centuries. Dover also publishes an extensive collection of mathematical, scientific, and engineering texts. It often targets its reprints at a niche market, such as woodworking. Starting in 2015, the company branched out into graphic novel reprints, overseen by Dover acquisitions editor and former comics writer and editor Drew Ford.

Most Dover reprints are photo facsimiles of the originals, retaining the original pagination and typeset, sometimes with a new introduction. Dover will usually add new and more colorful cover art to its paper-bound editions. They retitle some books to reflect modern dialect and categories. For example, the book Woodward's National Architect was retitled A Victorian Housebuilder's Guide.

== History ==
The Cirkers started the business selling remaindered books by mail. They named their company after 'The Dover', their apartment building in Forest Hills South, Queens, New York. The company published its first book, Jahnke and Emde's Tables of Functions with Formulas and Curves, when the German copyright was voided by the United States as a result of World War II. The book was an unexpected success and established the Dover business model of publishing esoteric works at a low price. One of Dover's best sellers was Albert Einstein's The Principle of Relativity, which Einstein was reluctant to republish due to his concerns that it was outdated.

Dover helped to transform the paperback book market. In 1951, it issued some of the earliest standard-sized paperbacks, a format that became known as a trade paperback. Since the 1960s, the vast majority of Dover's titles have been paper-bound books of various sizes. Dover paperbacks had sewn pages, unlike most paperbacks, which were held together with glue and subject to page drop-out.

Beginning in the 1950s, Dover also issued a series of Listen & Learn language courses prepared primarily using teachers from Columbia University.

For a time, Dover also published a catalog of LP phonograph records. Some, such as selected recordings of Schubert's solo and chamber works featuring pianist Friedrich Wührer, were reissues of earlier monaural releases from other labels. Noteworthy among Dover's original issues was an extensive series documenting pianist Beveridge Webster in literature ranging from Beethoven's Hammerklavier sonata to the second piano sonata by Roger Sessions. In keeping with its thrifty philosophy, by using lower recording levels, leading to narrower grooves, Dover was able to include more minutes than usual on each LP; however, the lower recording levels meant more noise and more vulnerability to scratches. Dover's foray into recordings was not as successful as its core business of book republication, and the company eventually abandoned it.

Starting in the 1990s, Dover has published a specialized line of low-cost reprints of public domain literature known as "Dover Thrift Editions", which are generally priced at US$5 or less. They also have several lines of foreign language books.

Hayward Cirker died in 2000 at the age of 82. In that same year, Dover Publications was acquired by Courier Corporation.

Courier was acquired by RR Donnelley in 2015. RR Donnelly split into three in 2016; Dover became part of LSC Communications.

In 2020, LSC Communications, Inc. and 21 affiliated debtors filed Chapter 11 bankruptcy in the United States District Court for the Southern District of New York. The company was purchased in December 2020 by the private equity holding company Atlas Holdings.

Blanche Cirker died in 2022.

== See also ==
- Avery Publishing
- Doubleday, Page & Company
