= Nu function =

Mathematical function

In mathematics, the nu function is a generalization of the reciprocal gamma function of the Laplace transform.

Formally, it can be defined as

$$\begin{align}
\nu(x) & \equiv \int_0^\infty \frac{x^t \, dt}{\Gamma(t+1)} \\[10pt]
\nu(x,\alpha) & \equiv \int_0^\infty \frac{x^{\alpha+t} \, dt}{\Gamma(\alpha+t+1)}
\end{align}$$

where $\Gamma(z)$ is the Gamma function.
