= Γ₀ =

Γ_{0} or Gamma 0 may refer to:

- Feferman–Schütte ordinal
- Hecke congruence subgroup, Γ_{0}(n)
- the multiple gamma function, Γ_{n}, for n = 0, as used in an inductive definition
