= Hölder's theorem =

Result on gamma function

In mathematics, Hölder's theorem states that the gamma function does not satisfy any algebraic differential equation whose coefficients are rational functions. This result was first proved by Otto Hölder in 1887; several alternative proofs have subsequently been found.

The theorem also generalizes to the $q$-gamma function.

== Statement of the theorem ==
For every $n \in \N_0,$ there is no non-zero polynomial $P \in \Complex [X;Y_0,Y_1,\ldots,Y_n]$ such that
$$\forall z \in \Complex \setminus \Z _{\leq 0}: \qquad P \left( z;\Gamma(z),\Gamma'(z),\ldots,{\Gamma^{(n)}}(z) \right) = 0,$$
where $\Gamma$ is the gamma function.

For example, define $P \in \Complex [X;Y_0,Y_1,Y_2]$ by
$$P ~ \stackrel{\text{df}}{=} ~ X^2 Y_2 + X Y_1 + (X^2 - \nu^2) Y_0.$$

Then the equation
$$P \left (z;f(z),f'(z),f''(z) \right ) = z^2 f''(z) + z f'(z) + \left (z^2 - \nu^2 \right ) f(z) \equiv 0$$
is called an algebraic differential equation, which, in this case, has the solutions $f = J_{\nu}$ and $f = Y_{\nu}$ — the Bessel functions of the first and second kind respectively. Hence, we say that $J_{\nu}$ and $Y_{\nu}$ are differentially algebraic (also algebraically transcendental). Most of the familiar special functions of mathematical physics are differentially algebraic. All algebraic combinations of differentially algebraic functions are differentially algebraic. Furthermore, all compositions of differentially algebraic functions are differentially algebraic. Hölder's Theorem simply states that the gamma function, $\Gamma$, is not differentially algebraic and is therefore transcendentally transcendental.

== Proof ==
Let $n \in \N_0,$ and assume that a non-zero polynomial $P \in \Complex [X;Y_0,Y_1,\ldots,Y_n]$ exists such that
$$\forall z \in \Complex \setminus \Z _{\leq 0}: \qquad P \left( z;\Gamma(z),\Gamma'(z),\ldots,{\Gamma^{(n)}}(z) \right) = 0.$$

As a non-zero polynomial in $\Complex [X]$ can never give rise to the zero function on any non-empty open domain of $\Complex$ (by the fundamental theorem of algebra), we may suppose, without loss of generality, that $P$ contains a monomial term having a non-zero power of one of the indeterminates $Y_0,Y_1,\ldots,Y_n$.

Assume also that $P$ has the lowest possible overall degree with respect to the lexicographic ordering $Y_0 < Y_1 < \cdots < Y_n < X.$ For example,
$$\deg \left(-3 X^{10} Y_0^2 Y_1^4 + i X^2Y_2 \right) < \deg \left( 2 X Y_0^3 - Y_1^4 \right)$$
because the highest power of $Y_{0}$ in any monomial term of the first polynomial is smaller than that of the second polynomial.

Next, observe that for all $z \in \Complex \smallsetminus \Z _{\leq 0}$ we have:
$$\begin{align}
&P \left(z + 1; \Gamma(z + 1), \Gamma'(z + 1), \Gamma''(z + 1),\ldots, \Gamma^{(n)}(z + 1) \right) \\[1ex]
&= P \left(z + 1;z \Gamma(z), [z \Gamma(z)]',[z \Gamma(z)]'',\ldots,[z \Gamma(z)]^{(n)} \right) \\[1ex]
&= P \left(z + 1;z \Gamma(z), z \Gamma'(z) + \Gamma(z),z \Gamma''(z) + 2\Gamma'(z),\ldots, z {\Gamma^{(n)}}(z) + n {\Gamma^{(n - 1)}}(z) \right).
\end{align}$$

If we define a second polynomial $Q \in \Complex [X;Y_0,Y_1,\ldots,Y_n]$ by the transformation
$$Q ~ \stackrel{\text{df}}{=} ~ P(X + 1;X Y_0,X Y_1 + Y_0,X Y_2 + 2 Y_1,\ldots,X Y_n + n Y_{n - 1}),$$
then we obtain the following algebraic differential equation for $\Gamma$:
$$\forall z \in \Complex \setminus \Z _{\leq 0}: \qquad Q \left( z;\Gamma(z),\Gamma'(z),\ldots,{\Gamma^{(n)}}(z) \right) \equiv 0.$$

Furthermore, let $X^h Y_0^{h_0} Y_1^{h_1} \cdots Y_n^{h_n}$ be the highest-degree monomial term in $P$, and define $S = h_0 + h_1 + \cdots + h_n$. Because the transformation for $Q$ substitutes $X+1$ for $X$, the leading monomial's $X^h$ term expands via the binomial theorem to $(X+1)^h$. To properly cancel the leading terms under the lexicographic ordering, we must multiply $P$ by a polynomial $R(X)$ that accounts for this expansion. Defining $R \in \Complex[X]$ as the polynomial quotient of $(X+1)^h X^S$ divided by $X^h$ (which, when $S \geq h$, is simply $(X+1)^h X^{S-h}$), the polynomial
$$Q - R(X) P$$
has a strictly smaller overall degree than $P$. As it clearly gives rise to an algebraic differential equation for $\Gamma$, it must be the zero polynomial by the minimality assumption on $P$. Hence, we get
$$Q= P(X + 1;X Y_0,X Y_1 + Y_0,X Y_2 + 2Y_1,\ldots,X Y_n + n Y_{n-1})= R(X) \cdot P(X;Y_0,Y_1,\ldots,Y_n).$$

Now, let $X = 0$ in $Q$. Assuming the generic case where $S > h$, we have $R(0) = 0$, yielding
$$Q(0;Y_0,Y_1,\ldots,Y_n) = P(1;0,Y_0,2 Y_1,\ldots,n Y_{n-1}) = R(0) \cdot P(0;Y_0,Y_1,\ldots,Y_n) = 0_{\Complex [Y_0,Y_1,\ldots,Y_n]}.$$
(In the edge cases where $S \leq h$, a similar deduction holds by observing that replacing $P$ with $P - P|_{X=0}$ would yield a polynomial of strictly smaller degree that still satisfies the differential equation, thereby forcing $P(1;0,Y_1,\ldots,Y_n) = 0$ directly to avoid contradicting minimality).

A change of variables then yields
$$P(1;0,Y_1,Y_2,\ldots,Y_n) = 0_{\Complex [Y_0,Y_1,\ldots,Y_n]},$$
and an application of mathematical induction (along with a change of variables at each induction step) to the earlier expression
$$P(X + 1;X Y_0,X Y_1 + Y_0,X Y_2 + 2Y_1,\ldots,X Y_n + nY_{n-1})= R(X) \cdot P(X;Y_0,Y_1,\ldots,Y_n)$$
reveals that
$$\forall m \in \N: \qquad P(m;0,Y_1,Y_2,\ldots,Y_n) = 0_{\Complex [Y_0,Y_1,\ldots,Y_n]}.$$

This is possible only if $P$ is divisible by $Y_{0}$, which contradicts the minimality assumption on $P$. Therefore, no such $P$ exists, and so $\Gamma$ is not differentially algebraic. Q.E.D.
