= Hypertranscendental number =

Type of complex number

A complex number is said to be hypertranscendental if it is not the value at an algebraic point of a function which is the solution of an algebraic differential equation with coefficients in $\mathbb{Z}[r]$ and with algebraic initial conditions.

The term was introduced by D. D. Morduhai-Boltovskoi in "Hypertranscendental numbers and hypertranscendental functions" (1949).

The term is related to transcendental numbers, which are numbers which are not a solution of a non-zero polynomial equation with rational coefficients. The number $e$ is transcendental but not hypertranscendental, as it can be generated from the solution to the differential equation $y' = y$.

Any hypertranscendental number is also a transcendental number.

== See also ==
- Hypertranscendental function
