= Ernst Hölder =

German mathematician (1901 – 1990)

Ernst Otto Hölder
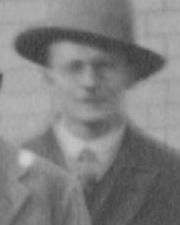
- Ernst Hölder, Oct 1930 in Jena
- Born: April 2, 1901; Leipzig, Germany
- Died: June 30, 1990 (aged 89); Mainz, Germany
- Education: University of Leipzig
- Father: Otto Hölder
- Scientific career
- Institutions: University of Leipzig; German Aeronautical Research Institute; University of Mainz
- Thesis: Gleichgewichtsfiguren rotierender Flüssigkeiten mit Oberflächenspannung (1926)
- Doctoral advisor: Leon Lichtenstein
- Doctoral students: Helmut H. Schaefer

Ernst Otto Hölder (2 April 1901 in Leipzig – 30 June 1990 in Mainz) was a German mathematician who made contributions to partial differential equations and continuum mechanics.

== Education and career ==
Hölder was born in Leipzig and studied at the University of Leipzig, where he earned his PhD in 1926 with a dissertation on fluid dynamics. Afterwards, he worked as an assistant at the University of Leipzig and passed the First State Examination in 1926. In 1929 he earned his habilitation, also at the University of Leipzig, with a topic on celestial mechanics. From 1929 to 1939, he worked as a privatdozent at the University of Leipzig, and from 1939 to 1945, he was a scientific member at the German Aeronautical Research Institute in Braunschweig.

After World War II, Hölder held various academic positions at the University of Leipzig, including as an extraordinary professor, head of the Mathematical Institute, and dean of the Philosophical Faculty II. In 1958, he left Leipzig and took a position as a professor at the Mathematical Institute at the University of Mainz, where he also served as co-director of the institute until his retirement in 1969.

== Honors and awards ==
Hölder was a member of several scientific societies, including the Saxonian Academy of Sciences in Leipzig, the German National Academy of Sciences Leopoldina, and the East German Academy of Sciences in Berlin.

== Personal life ==
Hölder was the eldest son of Otto Hölder, who was also a mathematician and professor at the University of Leipzig.
