= Otto Hölder =

German mathematician (1859–1937)

Ludwig Otto Hölder
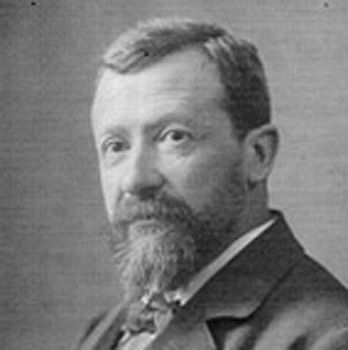
- Otto Hölder
- Born: 22 December 1859; Stuttgart, Kingdom of Württemberg
- Died: 29 August 1937 (aged 77); Leipzig, Germany
- Education: University of Stuttgart; University of Berlin; University of Tübingen
- Known for: Hölder condition Hölder mean Hölder summation Hölder's inequality Hölder's theorem Jordan–Hölder theorem
- Spouse: Helene Hölder
- Children: Ernst Hölder
- Scientific career
- Fields: Mathematics
- Workplaces: University of Göttingen; University of Tübingen; University of Leipzig
- Doctoral advisor: Paul du Bois-Reymond
- Doctoral students: Emil Artin; William Threlfall; Hermann Vermeil

Ludwig Otto Hölder (December 22, 1859 – August 29, 1937) was a German mathematician born in Stuttgart.

== Early life and education ==
Hölder was the youngest of three sons of professor Otto Hölder (1811–1890), and a grandson of professor Christian Gottlieb Hölder (1776–1847); his two brothers also became professors. He first studied at the Polytechnikum (which today is the University of Stuttgart) and then in 1877 went to Berlin where he was a student of Leopold Kronecker, Karl Weierstrass, and Ernst Kummer.

In 1877, he entered the University of Berlin and took his doctorate from the University of Tübingen in 1882. The title of his doctoral thesis was "Beiträge zur Potentialtheorie" ("Contributions to potential theory"). Following this, he went to the University of Leipzig but was unable to habilitate there, instead earning a second doctorate and habilitation at the University of Göttingen, both in 1884.

== Academic career and later life ==
He was unable to get government approval for a faculty position in Göttingen, and instead was offered a position as extraordinary professor at Tübingen in 1889. Temporary mental incapacitation delayed his acceptance but he began working there in 1890. In 1899, he took the former chair of Sophus Lie as a full professor at the University of Leipzig. There he served as dean from 1912 to 1913, and as rector in 1918.

He married Helene, the daughter of a bank director and politician, in 1899. They had two sons and two daughters. His son Ernst Hölder became another mathematician, and his daughter Irmgard married mathematician Aurel Wintner.

In 1933, Hölder signed the Vow of allegiance of the Professors of the German Universities and High-Schools to Adolf Hitler and the National Socialistic State.

== Mathematical contributions ==
Hölder's inequality, named for Hölder, was actually proven earlier by Leonard James Rogers. It is named for a paper in which Hölder, citing Rogers, reproves it; in turn, the same paper includes a proof of what is now called Jensen's inequality, with some side conditions that were later removed by Jensen. Hölder is also noted for many other theorems including the Jordan–Hölder theorem, the theorem stating that every linearly ordered group that satisfies an Archimedean property is isomorphic to a subgroup of the additive group of real numbers, the classification of simple groups of order up to 200, the anomalous outer automorphisms of the symmetric group S_{6}, and Hölder's theorem, which implies that the Gamma function satisfies no algebraic differential equation. Another idea related to his name is the Hölder condition (or Hölder continuity), which is used in many areas of analysis, including the theories of partial differential equations and function spaces.
