= Dover Thrift Edition =

Series of paperback books

Dover Thrift Editions are a series of paperback books published by Dover Publications starting in the 1990s. Thrift editions are printed economically and sold to consumers at a low price such as $1.00 to $2.50 in the United States, and £1.99 to £3.50 in the United Kingdom. Longer works are published as Dover Giant Thrift Editions and sold at about $5.00. Titles and authors are wide-ranging, but most are classic literature, drama, and poetry in the public domain. Some of the major works published include authors like Mary Shelley, William Shakespeare, Jane Austen, Charles Dickens, Mark Twain and Edgar Allan Poe.

Many schools use these editions due to their inexpensive cost.
