= Hypertranscendental function =

Mathematics analytic function

A hypertranscendental function or transcendentally transcendental function is a transcendental analytic function which is not the solution of an algebraic differential equation with coefficients in $\mathbb{Z}$ (the integers) and with algebraic initial conditions.

== History ==
The term 'transcendentally transcendental' was introduced by E. H. Moore in 1896; the term 'hypertranscendental' was introduced by D. D. Morduhai-Boltovskoi in 1914.

== Definition ==
One standard definition (there are slight variants) defines solutions of differential equations of the form

$$F\left(x, y, y', \cdots, y^{(n)} \right) = 0$$,

where $F$ is a polynomial with constant coefficients, as algebraically transcendental or differentially algebraic. Transcendental functions which are not algebraically transcendental are transcendentally transcendental. Hölder's theorem shows that the gamma function is in this category.

Hypertranscendental functions usually arise as the solutions to functional equations, for example the gamma function.

== Examples ==
=== Hypertranscendental functions ===
- The zeta functions of algebraic number fields, in particular, the Riemann zeta function
- The gamma function (cf. Hölder's theorem)

=== Transcendental but not hypertranscendental functions ===
- The exponential function, logarithm, and the trigonometric and hyperbolic functions.
- The generalized hypergeometric functions, including special cases such as Bessel functions (except some special cases which are algebraic).

=== Non-transcendental (algebraic) functions ===
- All algebraic functions, in particular polynomials.

== See also ==
- Hypertranscendental number
