= Fransén–Robinson constant =

Mathematical constant

The curve is $1/\Gamma(x)$, the shaded region is $\textstyle F = \int_0^a \frac{1}{\Gamma(x)}\,dx$. As the upper bound of integration $a$ goes to infinity, the approximation approaches the actual value.

In mathematics. the Fransén–Robinson constant, usually denoted $F$, is a constant equal to the area between the graph of the reciprocal Gamma function and the positive $x$-axis. Formally,

$$F = \int_0^\infty \frac{1}{\Gamma(x)}\,dx = 2.8077702420285\dots$$

(sequence A058655 in the OEIS).

== Other expressions ==
The Fransén–Robinson constant has continued fraction representation

$$[2; 1, 4, 4, 1, 18, 5, 1, 3, 4, 1, 5, 3, 6, \dots]$$

(sequence A046943 in the OEIS). The constant is somewhat close to Euler's number $e = 2.71828\dots$, which can be explained by the following approximation:

$$F = \int_0^\infty \frac{1}{\Gamma(x)}\,dx \approx \sum_{n=1}^\infty \frac{1}{\Gamma(n)} = \sum_{n=0}^\infty \frac{1}{n!} =e.$$

The difference is

$$F - e = \int_0^\infty \frac{e^{-x}}{\pi^2 + (\ln x)^2}\,dx$$

or equivalently

$$F = e + \frac{1}{\pi} \int_{-\pi/2}^{\pi/2} e^{\pi \tan \theta} e^{-e^{\pi \tan \theta}}\,d\theta.$$

The Fransén–Robinson constant can also be expressed using the Mittag-Leffler function as the limit

$$F = \lim_{\alpha \to 0} \alpha E_{\alpha, 0}(1).$$

It is however unknown whether $F$ can be expressed in closed form in terms of other known constants.

== Calculation history ==
A fair amount of effort has been made to calculate the numerical value of the Fransén–Robinson constant with high accuracy.

The value was computed to 36 decimal places by Herman P. Robinson using 11 point Newton–Cotes quadrature, to 65 digits by A. Fransén using Euler–Maclaurin summation, and to 80 digits by Fransén and S. Wrigge using Taylor series and other methods. William A. Johnson computed 300 digits, and Pascal Sebah was able to compute 1025 digits using Clenshaw–Curtis integration.
