= Wielandt theorem =

Characterization of the gamma function

In mathematics, the Wielandt theorem characterizes the gamma function, defined for all complex numbers $z$ for which $\mathrm{Re}\,z > 0$ by

$$\Gamma(z)=\int_0^{+\infty} t^{z-1} \mathrm e^{-t}\,\mathrm dt,$$

as the only function $f$ defined on the half-plane $H := \{ z \in \Complex : \operatorname{Re}\,z > 0\}$ such that:

- $f$ is holomorphic on $H$;
- $f(1)=1$;
- $f(z+1)=z\,f(z)$ for all $z \in H$ and
- $f$ is bounded on the strip $\{ z \in \Complex : 1 \leq \operatorname{Re}\,z \leq 2\}$.

This theorem is named after the mathematician Helmut Wielandt.

== See also ==
- Bohr–Mollerup theorem
- Hadamard's gamma function
