= Reciprocal gamma function =

Mathematical function

Plot of 1/Γ(x) along the real axis

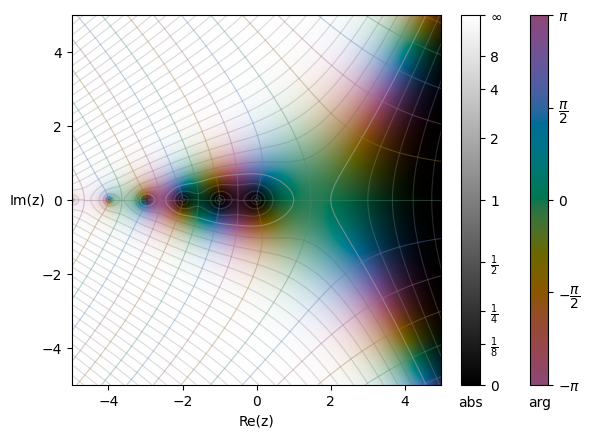
Reciprocal gamma function 1/Γ(z) in the complex plane, plotted using domain coloring.

In mathematics, the reciprocal gamma function is the function
$$f(z) = \frac{1}{\Gamma(z)},$$
where Γ(z) denotes the gamma function. Since the gamma function is meromorphic and nonzero everywhere in the complex plane, its reciprocal is an entire function. As an entire function, it is of order 1 (meaning that log log |1/Γ(z)| grows no faster than log |z|), but of infinite type (meaning that log |1/Γ(z)| grows faster than any multiple of |z|, since its growth is approximately proportional to |z| log |z| in the left-half plane).

The reciprocal is sometimes used as a starting point for numerical computation of the gamma function, and a few software libraries provide it separately from the regular gamma function.

Karl Weierstrass called the reciprocal gamma function the "factorielle" and used it in his development of the Weierstrass factorization theorem.

== Infinite product expansion ==
Following from the infinite product definitions for the gamma function, due to Euler and Weierstrass respectively, we get the following infinite product expansion for the reciprocal gamma function:
$$\begin{align}
\frac{1}{\Gamma(z)} &=  z \prod_{n=1}^\infty \frac{1+\frac{z}{n}}{\left(1+\frac{1}{n}\right)^z} \\
\frac{1}{\Gamma(z)} &= z e^{\gamma z} \prod_{n=1}^\infty \left(1 + \frac{z}{n}\right) e^{-\frac{z}{n}}
\end{align}$$

where γ = 0.577216... is the Euler–Mascheroni constant. These expansions are valid for all complex numbers z.

== Taylor series ==
Taylor series expansion around 0 gives:
$$\frac{1}{\ \Gamma(z)\ } = z + \gamma\ z^2 + \left(\frac{\gamma^2}{2} - \frac{\pi^2}{12}\right)\ z^3 + \left(\frac{\gamma^3}{6} - \frac{\gamma\pi^2}{12} + \frac{\zeta(3)}{3}\ \right)z^4 + \cdots\$$
where γ is the Euler–Mascheroni constant. For n > 2, the coefficient a_{n} for the z^{n} term can be computed recursively as
$$a_n = \frac{\ {a_2\ a_{n-1} + \sum_{j=2}^{n-1} (-1)^{j+1}\ \zeta(j)\ a_{n-j}}\ }{n-1} = \frac{\ \gamma\ a_{n-1} - \zeta(2)\ a_{n-2} + \zeta(3)\ a_{n-3}-\cdots\ }{n-1}$$
where ζ is the Riemann zeta function. An integral representation for these coefficients was recently found by Fekih-Ahmed (2014):
$$a_n = \frac{(-1)^n}{\pi n!}\int_0^\infty e^{-t}\ \operatorname{Im}\Bigl[\ \bigl( \log(t)-i\pi \bigr)^n\ \Bigr]\ \mathrm{d} t ~.$$

For small values, these give the following values:

n	a_{n}
1	+1.0000000000000000000000000000000000000000
2	+0.5772156649015328606065120900824024310422
3	−0.6558780715202538810770195151453904812798
4	−0.0420026350340952355290039348754298187114
5	+0.1665386113822914895017007951021052357178
6	−0.0421977345555443367482083012891873913017
7	−0.0096219715278769735621149216723481989754
8	+0.0072189432466630995423950103404465727099
9	−0.0011651675918590651121139710840183886668
10	−0.0002152416741149509728157299630536478065
11	+0.0001280502823881161861531986263281643234
12	−0.0000201348547807882386556893914210218184
13	−0.0000012504934821426706573453594738330922
14	+0.0000011330272319816958823741296203307449
15	−0.0000002056338416977607103450154130020573
16	+0.0000000061160951044814158178624986828553
17	+0.0000000050020076444692229300556650480600
18	−0.0000000011812745704870201445881265654365
19	+0.0000000001043426711691100510491540332312
20	+0.0000000000077822634399050712540499373114
21	−0.0000000000036968056186422057081878158781
22	+0.0000000000005100370287454475979015481323
23	−0.0000000000000205832605356650678322242954
24	−0.0000000000000053481225394230179823700173
25	+0.0000000000000012267786282382607901588938
26	−0.0000000000000001181259301697458769513765
27	+0.0000000000000000011866922547516003325798
28	+0.0000000000000000014123806553180317815558
29	−0.0000000000000000002298745684435370206592
30	+0.0000000000000000000171440632192733743338

Fekih-Ahmed (2014) also gives an approximation for a_{n}:

$$a_n \approx \frac{(-1)^n}{\ (n-1)!\ } \ \sqrt{ \frac{2}{\ \pi n \ }\ }\
\operatorname{Im} \left( \frac{\ z_0^{\left( 1/2 - n \right)}\ e^{-n z_0}\ }{\sqrt{ 1 + z_0\ }} \right)\ ,$$
where z_{0} = −1/n exp(W_{−1}(−n)), and W_{−1} is the negative-first branch of the Lambert W function.

The Taylor expansion around 1 has the same (but shifted) coefficients, i.e.:
$$\frac{1}{\Gamma(1+z)} = \frac{1}{z\Gamma(z)} = 1 + \gamma\ z + \left(\frac{\gamma^2}{2} - \frac{\pi^2}{12}\right)\ z^2 + \left(\frac{\gamma^3}{6} - \frac{\gamma\pi^2}{12} + \frac{\zeta(3)}{3}\ \right)z^3 + \cdots\$$
(the reciprocal of Gauss's pi function).

== Asymptotic expansion ==
As |z| goes to infinity at a constant arg(z) we have:
$$\ln (1/\Gamma(z)) \sim -z \ln (z) + z + \tfrac{1}{2} \ln \left (\frac{z}{2\pi} \right ) - \frac{1}{12z} + \frac{1}{360z^3} -\frac{1}{1260 z^5}\qquad \text{for}~ \left|\arg(z)\right| < \pi$$

== Contour integral representation ==
An integral representation due to Hermann Hankel is
$$\frac{1}{\Gamma(z)} = \frac{i}{2\pi} \oint_H (-t)^{-z} e^{-t} \, dt,$$
where H is the Hankel contour, that is, the path encircling 0 in the positive direction, beginning at and returning to positive infinity with respect for the branch cut along the positive real axis. According to Schmelzer & Trefethen, numerical evaluation of Hankel's integral is the basis of some of the best methods for computing the gamma function.

== Integral representations at the positive integers ==
For positive integers n ≥ 1, there is an integral for the reciprocal factorial function given by
$$\frac{1}{n!} = \frac{1}{2\pi} \int_{-\pi}^{\pi} e^{-nit} e^{e^{it}}\ dt.$$

Similarly, for any real c > 0 and z ∈ C such that Re(z) > 0 we have the next integral for the reciprocal gamma function along the real axis in the form of:
$$\frac{1}{\Gamma(z)} = \frac{1}{2\pi} \int_{-\infty}^{\infty} (c+ it)^{-z} e^{c+it} dt,$$
where the particular case when z = n + 1/2 provides a corresponding relation for the reciprocal double factorial function,
$$\frac{1}{(2n-1)!!} = \frac{\sqrt{\pi}}{2^n \cdot \Gamma\left(n+\frac{1}{2}\right)}.$$

== Integral along the real axis ==
Integration of the reciprocal gamma function along the positive real axis gives the value
$$\int_{0}^\infty \frac{1}{\Gamma(x)}\, dx \approx 2.80777024,$$
which is known as the Fransén–Robinson constant.

We have the following formula
$$\int_0^\infty \dfrac{a^x}{\Gamma(x)}\,dx=ae^a+a\int_0^\infty\dfrac{e^{-ax}}{\log^2(x)+\pi^2}\,dx$$

== See also ==
- Bessel–Clifford function
- Inverse-gamma distribution
- Nu function
