= Q-gamma function =

Function in q-analog theory

In q-analog theory, the $q$-gamma function, or basic gamma function, is a generalization of the ordinary gamma function closely related to the double gamma function. It was introduced by Jackson (1905). It is given by
$$\Gamma_q(x) = (1-q)^{1-x}\prod_{n=0}^\infty \frac{1-q^{n+1}}{1-q^{n+x}}=(1-q)^{1-x}\,\frac{(q;q)_\infty}{(q^x;q)_\infty}$$
when $|q|<1$, and
$$\Gamma_q(x)=\frac{(q^{-1};q^{-1})_\infty}{(q^{-x};q^{-1})_\infty}(q-1)^{1-x}q^{\binom{x}{2}}$$
if $|q|>1$. Here $(\cdot;\cdot)_\infty$ is the infinite $q$-Pochhammer symbol. The $q$-gamma function satisfies the functional equation
$$\Gamma_q(x+1) = \frac{1-q^{x}}{1-q}\Gamma_q(x)=[x]_q\Gamma_q(x)$$
In addition, the $q$-gamma function satisfies the q-analog of the Bohr–Mollerup theorem, which was found by Richard Askey (Askey (1978)).

For non-negative integers $n$,
$$\Gamma_q(n)=[n-1]_q!$$
where $[\cdot]_q$ is the $q$-factorial function. Thus the $q$-gamma function can be considered as an extension of the $q$-factorial function to the real numbers.

The relation to the ordinary gamma function is made explicit in the limit
$$\lim_{q \to 1\pm} \Gamma_q(x) = \Gamma(x).$$
There is a simple proof of this limit by Gosper. See the appendix of (Andrews (1986)).

== Transformation properties ==
The $q$-gamma function satisfies the q-analog of the Gauss multiplication formula (Gasper & Rahman (2004)):
$$\Gamma_q(nx)\Gamma_r(1/n)\Gamma_r(2/n)\cdots\Gamma_r((n-1)/n)=\left(\frac{1-q^n}{1-q}\right)^{nx-1}\Gamma_r(x)\Gamma_r(x+1/n)\cdots\Gamma_r(x+(n-1)/n), \ r=q^n.$$

=== Integral representation ===
The $q$-gamma function has the following integral representation (Ismail (1981)):
$$\frac{1}{\Gamma_q(z)}=\frac{\sin(\pi z)}{\pi}\int_0^\infty\frac{t^{-z}\mathrm{d}t}{(-t(1-q);q)_{\infty}}.$$

=== Stirling formula ===
Moak obtained the following q-analogue of the Stirling formula (see Moak (1984)):
$$\log\Gamma_q(x)\sim(x-1/2)\log[x]_q+\frac{\mathrm{Li}_2(1-q^x)}{\log q}+C_{\hat{q}}+\frac{1}{2}H(q-1)\log q+\sum_{k=1}^\infty
\frac{B_{2k}}{(2k)!}\left(\frac{\log \hat{q}}{\hat{q}^x-1}\right)^{2k-1}\hat{q}^x p_{2k-3}(\hat{q}^x), \ x\to\infty,$$
$$\hat{q}=
\left\{\begin{aligned}
q \quad \mathrm{if} \ &0<q\leq1 \\
1/q \quad \mathrm{if} \ &q\geq1
\end{aligned}\right\},$$
$$C_q = \frac{1}{2} \log(2\pi)+\frac{1}{2}\log\left(\frac{q-1}{\log q}\right)-\frac{1}{24}\log q+\log\sum_{m=-\infty}^\infty \left(r^{m(6m+1)} - r^{(3m+1)(2m+1)}\right),$$
where $r=\exp(4\pi^2/\log q)$, $H$ denotes the Heaviside step function, $B_k$ stands for the Bernoulli number, $\mathrm{Li}_2(z)$ is the dilogarithm, and $p_k$ is a polynomial of degree $k$ satisfying
$$p_k(z)=z(1-z)p'_{k-1}(z)+(kz+1)p_{k-1}(z), p_0=p_{-1}=1, k=1,2,\cdots.$$

== Raabe-type formulas ==
Due to I. Mező, the q-analogue of the Raabe formula exists, at least if we use the $q$-gamma function when $|q|>1$. With this restriction,
$$\int_0^1\log\Gamma_q(x)dx=\frac{\zeta(2)}{\log q}+\log\sqrt{\frac{q-1}{\sqrt[6]{q}}}+\log(q^{-1};q^{-1})_\infty \quad(q>1).$$
El Bachraoui considered the case $0<q<1$ and proved that
$$\int_0^1\log\Gamma_q(x)dx=\frac{1}{2}\log (1-q) - \frac{\zeta(2)}{\log q}+\log(q;q)_\infty \quad(0<q<1).$$

== Special values ==
The following special values are known.
$$\Gamma_{e^{-\pi}}\left(\frac12\right)=\frac{e^{-7 \pi /16} \sqrt{e^\pi-1}\sqrt[4]{1+\sqrt2}}{2^{15/16}\pi^{3/4}} \, \Gamma \left(\frac{1}{4}\right),$$
$$\Gamma_{e^{-2\pi}}\left(\frac12\right)=\frac{e^{-7 \pi /8} \sqrt{e^{2 \pi}-1}}{2^{9/8} \pi^{3/4}} \, \Gamma \left(\frac{1}{4}\right),$$
$$\Gamma_{e^{-4\pi}}\left(\frac12\right)=\frac{e^{-7 \pi /4} \sqrt{e^{4 \pi}-1}}{2^{7/4} \pi^{3/4}} \, \Gamma \left(\frac{1}{4}\right),$$
$$\Gamma_{e^{-8\pi}}\left(\frac12\right)=\frac{e^{-7 \pi /2} \sqrt{e^{8 \pi}-1}}{2^{9/4} \pi^{3/4} \sqrt{1+\sqrt2}} \, \Gamma \left(\frac{1}{4}\right).$$
These are the analogues of the classical formula $\Gamma\left(\frac12\right)=\sqrt\pi$.

Moreover, the following analogues of the familiar identity $\Gamma\left(\frac14\right)\Gamma\left(\frac34\right)=\sqrt2\pi$ hold true:
$$\Gamma_{e^{-2\pi}}\left(\frac14\right)\Gamma_{e^{-2\pi}}\left(\frac34\right)=\frac{e^{-29 \pi /16} \left(e^{2 \pi }-1\right)\sqrt[4]{1+\sqrt2}}{2^{33/16} \pi^{3/2}} \, \Gamma \left(\frac{1}{4}\right)^2,$$
$$\Gamma_{e^{-4\pi}}\left(\frac14\right)\Gamma_{e^{-4\pi}}\left(\frac34\right)=\frac{e^{-29 \pi /8} \left(e^{4 \pi }-1\right)}{2^{23/8} \pi ^{3/2}} \, \Gamma \left(\frac{1}{4}\right)^2,$$
$$\Gamma_{e^{-8\pi}}\left(\frac14\right)\Gamma_{e^{-8\pi}}\left(\frac34\right)=\frac{e^{-29 \pi /4} \left(e^{8 \pi }-1\right)}{16 \pi ^{3/2} \sqrt{1+\sqrt2}} \, \Gamma \left(\frac{1}{4}\right)^2.$$

== Matrix version ==
Let $A$ be a complex square matrix and positive-definite matrix. Then a $q$-gamma matrix function can be defined by $q$-integral:
$$\Gamma_q(A):=\int_0^{\frac{1}{1-q}}t^{A-I}E_q(-qt)\mathrm{d}_q t$$
where $E_q$ is the q-exponential function.

== Other q-gamma functions ==
For other $q$-gamma functions, see Yamasaki 2006.

== Numerical computation ==
An iterative algorithm to compute the q-gamma function was proposed by Gabutti and Allasia.
