= Hadamard's gamma function =

Extension of the factorial function

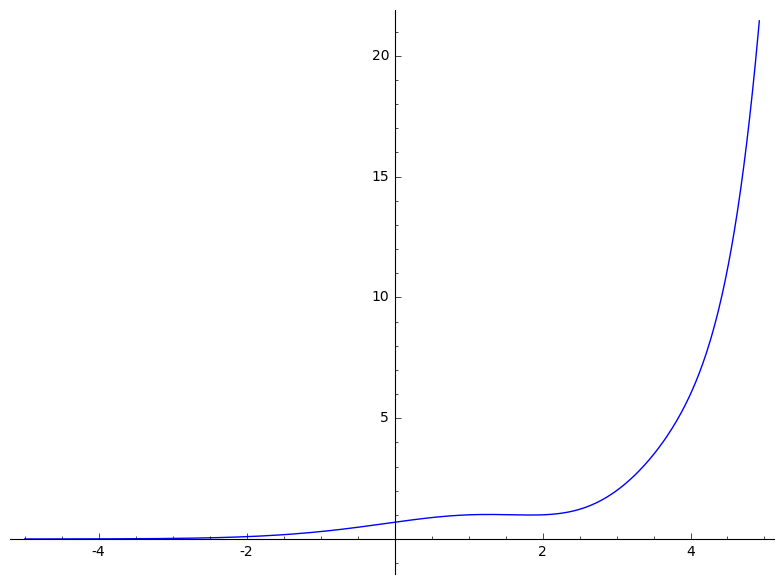
Hadamard's gamma function plotted over part of the real axis. Unlike the classical gamma function, it is holomorphic; there are no poles.

In mathematics, Hadamard's gamma function, named after Jacques Hadamard, is an extension of the factorial function, different from the classical gamma function (it is an instance of a pseudogamma function). This function, with its argument shifted down by 1, interpolates the factorial and extends it to real and complex numbers in a different way from Euler's gamma function. It is defined as:

$$H(x) = \frac{1}{\Gamma (1-x)}\,\dfrac{d}{dx} \left \{ \ln \left ( \frac{\Gamma ( \frac{1}{2}-\frac{x}{2})}{\Gamma (1-\frac{x}{2})}\right ) \right \},$$

where Γ(x) denotes the classical gamma function. If n is a positive integer, then:

$$H(n) = \Gamma(n) = (n-1)!$$

== Properties ==
Unlike the classical gamma function, Hadamard's gamma function H(x) is an entire function, i.e., it is defined and analytic at all complex numbers. It satisfies the functional equation

$$H(x+1) = xH(x) + \frac{1}{\Gamma(1-x)},$$

with the understanding that $\tfrac{1}{\Gamma(1-x)}$ is taken to be 0 for positive integer values of x.

The Hadamard's gamma function has a superadditive property:

$$H(x)+H(y)\leq H(x+y) ,$$

for all $x,y \geq \alpha$, where $\alpha=1.5031...$ (sequence A381340 in the OEIS) is the unique solution to the equation $H(2t)=2H(t)$ in the interval $[1.5, \infty)$.

== Representations ==
Hadamard's gamma can also be expressed as

$$H(x)=\frac{\psi\left ( 1 - \frac{x}{2}\right )-\psi\left ( \frac{1}{2} - \frac{x}{2}\right )}{2\Gamma (1-x)} = \frac{L\left(-1, 1, -x\right)}{\Gamma(-x)},$$

and also as

$$H(x) = \Gamma(x) \left [ 1 + \frac{\sin (\pi x)}{2\pi} \left \{ \psi \left ( \dfrac{x}{2} \right ) - \psi \left ( \dfrac{x+1}{2} \right ) \right \} \right ],$$

where ψ(x) denotes the digamma function, and $L$ denotes the Lerch zeta function.

== See also ==
- Gamma function
- Pseudogamma function
