= Johannes Mollerup =

Danish mathematician

Johannes Mollerup (3 December 1872 – 27 June 1937) was a Danish mathematician.

Mollerup studied at the University of Copenhagen, and received his doctorate in 1903.

Together with Harald Bohr, he developed the Bohr–Mollerup theorem which provides an easy characterization of the gamma function.
