= Logarithmically convex function =

Function whose composition with the logarithm is convex

In mathematics, a function $f$ is logarithmically convex or superconvex if ${\log}\circ f$, the composition of the logarithm with $f$, is itself a convex function.

== Definition ==
Let X be a convex subset of a real vector space, and let f : X → R be a function taking non-negative values. Then f is:

- Logarithmically convex if ${\log} \circ f$ is convex, and
- Strictly logarithmically convex if ${\log} \circ f$ is strictly convex.

Here we interpret $\log 0$ as $-\infty$.

Explicitly, f is logarithmically convex if and only if, for all x_{1}, x_{2} ∈ X and all t ∈ [0, 1], the two following equivalent conditions hold:

$$\begin{align}
\log f(tx_1 + (1 - t)x_2) &\le t\log f(x_1) + (1 - t)\log f(x_2), \\
f(tx_1 + (1 - t)x_2) &\le f(x_1)^tf(x_2)^{1-t}.
\end{align}$$

Similarly, f is strictly logarithmically convex if and only if, in the above two expressions, strict inequality holds for all t ∈ (0, 1).

The above definition permits f to be zero, but if f is logarithmically convex and vanishes anywhere in X, then it vanishes everywhere in the interior of X.

=== Equivalent conditions ===
If f is a differentiable function defined on an interval I ⊆ R, then f is logarithmically convex if and only if the following condition holds for all x and y in I:

$$\log f(x) \ge \log f(y) + \frac{f'(y)}{f(y)}(x - y).$$

This is equivalent to the condition that, whenever x and y are in I and x > y,

$$\left(\frac{f(x)}{f(y)}\right)^{\frac{1}{x - y}} \ge \exp\left(\frac{f'(y)}{f(y)}\right).$$

Moreover, f is strictly logarithmically convex if and only if these inequalities are always strict.

If f is twice differentiable, then it is logarithmically convex if and only if, for all x in I,

$$f''(x)f(x) \ge f'(x)^2.$$

If the inequality is always strict, then f is strictly logarithmically convex. However, the converse is false: It is possible that f is strictly logarithmically convex and that, for some x, we have $f''(x)f(x) = f'(x)^2$. For example, if $f(x) = \exp(x^4)$, then f is strictly logarithmically convex, but $f''(0)f(0) = 0 = f'(0)^2$.

Furthermore, $f\colon I \to (0, \infty)$ is logarithmically convex if and only if $e^{\alpha x}f(x)$ is convex for all $\alpha\in\mathbb R$.

== Sufficient conditions ==
If $f_1, \ldots, f_n$ are logarithmically convex, and if $w_1, \ldots, w_n$ are non-negative real numbers, then $f_1^{w_1} \cdots f_n^{w_n}$ is logarithmically convex.

If $\{f_i\}_{i \in I}$ is any family of logarithmically convex functions, then $g = \sup_{i \in I} f_i$ is logarithmically convex.

If $f \colon X \to I \subseteq \mathbf{R}$ is convex and $g \colon I \to \mathbf{R}_{\ge 0}$ is logarithmically convex and non-decreasing, then $g \circ f$ is logarithmically convex.

== Properties ==
A logarithmically convex function f is a convex function since it is the composite of the increasing convex function $\exp$ and the function $\log\circ f$, which is by definition convex. However, being logarithmically convex is a strictly stronger property than being convex. For example, the squaring function $f(x) = x^2$ is convex, but its logarithm $\log f(x) = 2\log |x|$ is not. Therefore the squaring function is not logarithmically convex.

== Examples ==
- $f(x) = \exp(|x|^p)$ is logarithmically convex when $p \ge 1$ and strictly logarithmically convex when $p > 1$.
- $f(x) = \frac{1}{x^p}$ is strictly logarithmically convex on $(0,\infty)$ for all $p>0.$
- Euler's gamma function is strictly logarithmically convex when restricted to the positive real numbers. In fact, by the Bohr–Mollerup theorem, this property can be used to characterize Euler's gamma function among the possible extensions of the factorial function to real arguments.

== See also ==
- Logarithmically concave function
