= Multiple gamma function =

Generalization of the Euler gamma function and the Barnes G-function

Plot of the Barnes G aka double gamma function G(z) in the complex plane from -2-2i to 2+2i with colors created with Mathematica 13.1 function ComplexPlot3D

In mathematics, the multiple gamma function $\Gamma_N$ is a generalization of the Euler gamma function and the Barnes G-function. The double gamma function was studied by Barnes (1901). At the end of this paper he mentioned the existence of multiple gamma functions generalizing it, and studied these further in Barnes (1904).

Double gamma functions $\Gamma_2$ are closely related to the q-gamma function, and triple gamma functions $\Gamma_3$ are related to the elliptic gamma function.

== Definition ==
For $\Re a_i>0$, let

$$\Gamma_N(w\mid a_1,\ldots,a_N) = \exp\left(\left.\frac{\partial}{\partial s} \zeta_N(s,w \mid a_1, \ldots, a_N) \right|_{s=0} \right)\ ,$$

where $\zeta_N$ is the Barnes zeta function. (This differs by a constant from Barnes's original definition.)

== Properties ==
Considered as a meromorphic function of $w$, $\Gamma_N(w\mid a_1,\ldots,a_N)$ has no zeros. It has poles at $w= -\sum_{i=1}^N n_ia_i$for non-negative integers $n_i$. These poles are simple unless some of them coincide. Up to multiplication by the exponential of a polynomial, $\Gamma_N(w\mid a_1,\ldots,a_N)$ is the unique meromorphic function of finite order with these zeros and poles.

- $\Gamma_0(w\mid) = \frac{1}{w}\ ,$
- $\Gamma_1(w\mid a) = \frac{a^{a^{-1}w-\frac12}}{\sqrt{2\pi}} \Gamma\left(a^{-1} w\right)\ ,$
- $\Gamma_N(w\mid a_1,\ldots,a_N)=\Gamma_{N-1}(w\mid a_1,\ldots,a_{N-1})\Gamma_N(w+a_N\mid a_1,\ldots,a_N)\ .$

In the case of the double Gamma function, the asymptotic behaviour for $w\to \infty$ is known, and the leading factor is

$$\Gamma_2(w|a_1,a_2)\ \underset{w\to \infty}{\sim}\ w^{\frac{w^2}{2a_1a_2}} \quad \text{for}\quad \left\{\begin{array}{l} \frac{a_1}{a_2}\in\mathbb{C}\backslash(-\infty,0]\ ,
\\ w \in \mathbb{C}\backslash \left(\mathbb{R}_+a_1+\mathbb{R}_+a_2\right)\ . \end{array}\right.$$

== Infinite product representation ==
The multiple gamma function has an infinite product representation that makes it manifest that it is meromorphic, and that also makes the positions of its poles manifest. In the case of the double gamma function, this representation is

$$\Gamma_2(w\mid a_1,a_2) = \frac{e^{\lambda_1w +\lambda_2 w^2}}{w} \prod_{\begin{array}{c} (n_1,n_2)\in\mathbb{N}^2\\ (n_1,n_2)\neq (0,0)\end{array}} \frac{e^{\frac{w}{n_1a_1+n_2a_2}- \frac12 \frac{w^2}{(n_1a_1+n_2a_2)^2}}}{1+\frac{w}{n_1a_1+n_2a_2}}\ ,$$

where we define the $w$-independent coefficients

$$\lambda_1 = -\underset{s=1}{\operatorname{Res}_0}\zeta_2(s,0\mid a_1,a_2)\ ,$$
$$\lambda_2 = \frac12\underset{s=2}{\operatorname{Res}_0}\zeta_2(s,0\mid a_1,a_2) + \frac12 \underset{s=2}{\operatorname{Res}_1}\zeta_2(s,0\mid a_1,a_2)\ ,$$

where $\underset{s=s_0}{\operatorname{Res}_n} f(s) = \frac{1}{2\pi i}\oint_{s_0} (s-s_0)^{n-1} f(s) \, ds$ is an $n$-th order residue at $s_0$.

Another representation as a product over $\mathbb{N}$ leads to an algorithm for numerically computing the double Gamma function.

A numerical implementation of the Barnes multiple gamma function is available in the Wolfram Function Repository.

== Reduction to the Barnes G-function ==
The double gamma function with parameters $1,1$ obeys the relations

$$\Gamma_2(w+1|1,1) = \frac{\sqrt{2\pi}}{\Gamma(w)} \Gamma_2(w|1,1) \quad , \quad \Gamma_2(1|1,1) = \sqrt{2\pi} \ .$$

It is related to the Barnes G-function by

$$\Gamma_2(w|\alpha,\alpha) = (2\pi)^\frac{w}{2\alpha} \alpha^{-\frac{w^2}{2\alpha^2} + \frac{w}{\alpha} - 1} G(w / \alpha)^{-1} \ .$$

== The double gamma function and conformal field theory ==
For $\Re b>0$ and $Q=b+b^{-1}$, the function

$$\Gamma_b(w) = \frac{\Gamma_2(w\mid b,b^{-1})}{\Gamma_2\left(\frac{Q}{2}\mid b,b^{-1}\right)}\ ,$$

is invariant under $b\to b^{-1}$, and obeys the relations

$$\Gamma_b(w+b) = \sqrt{2\pi}\frac{b^{bw-\frac12}}{\Gamma(bw)}\Gamma_b(w)\quad , \quad \Gamma_b(w+b^{-1}) = \sqrt{2\pi}\frac{b^{-b^{-1}w+\frac12}}{\Gamma(b^{-1}w)} \Gamma_b(w)\ .$$

It also obeys the multiplication formula

$$\Gamma_b(w) = \lambda_{m,n,b} (mn)^{\frac14 w(b+b^{-1}-w)} \prod_{r=0}^{m-1}\prod_{s=0}^{n-1} \Gamma_{b\sqrt{\frac{m}{n}}} \left(\frac{w+rb+sb^{-1}}{\sqrt{mn}}\right)$$

In particular, the case $m=n=2$ is a duplication formula,

$$\Gamma_b(2w) = \lambda_b 2^{w(b+b^{-1}-2w)} \Gamma_b(w)\Gamma_b(w+\tfrac{b}{2})\Gamma_b(w+\tfrac{1}{2b})\Gamma_b(w+\tfrac{b}{2}+\tfrac{1}{2b})$$

For $\Re w>0$, it has the integral representation

$$\log\Gamma_b(w) = \int_0^\infty\frac{dt}{t}\left[\frac{e^{-wt}-e^{-\frac{Q}{2}t}}{(1-e^{-bt})(1-e^{-b^{-1}t})} -\frac{\left(\frac{Q}{2}-w\right)^2}{2}e^{-t} -\frac{\frac{Q}{2}-w}{t}\right]\ .$$

From the function $\Gamma_b(w)$, we define the double Sine function $S_b(w)$ and the Upsilon function $\Upsilon_b(w)$ by

$$S_b(w) =\frac{\Gamma_b(w)}{\Gamma_b(Q-w)} \quad , \quad \Upsilon_b(w)=\frac{1}{\Gamma_b(w)\Gamma_b(Q-w)}\ .$$

These functions obey the relations

$$S_b(w+b) = 2\sin(\pi bw)S_b(w) \quad , \quad \Upsilon_b(w+b)=\frac{\Gamma(bw)}{\Gamma(1-bw)} b^{1-2bw}\Upsilon_b(w) \ ,$$

plus the relations that are obtained by $b\to b^{-1}$. For $0<\Re w<\Re Q$ they have the integral representations

$$\log S_b(w) = \int_0^\infty\frac{dt}{t}\left[
\frac{ \sinh\left(\frac{Q}{2}-w\right)t}{2\sinh\left(\frac12 bt\right)\sinh\left(\frac12 b^{-1}t\right)}-\frac{Q-2w}{t}\right]\ ,$$

$$\log \Upsilon_b(w) = \int_0^\infty\frac{dt}{t}\left[\left(\frac{Q}{2}-w\right)^2e^{-t} -\frac{\sinh^2\frac12\left(\frac{Q}{2}-w\right)t}{\sinh\left(\frac12 bt\right)\sinh\left(\frac12 b^{-1}t\right)}\right]\ .$$

The functions $\Gamma_b,S_b$ and $\Upsilon_b$ appear in correlation functions of two-dimensional conformal field theory, with the parameter $b$ being related to the central charge of the underlying Virasoro algebra. In particular, the three-point function of Liouville theory is written in terms of the function $\Upsilon_b$.
