= Eugen Jahnke =

German mathematician (1861–1921)

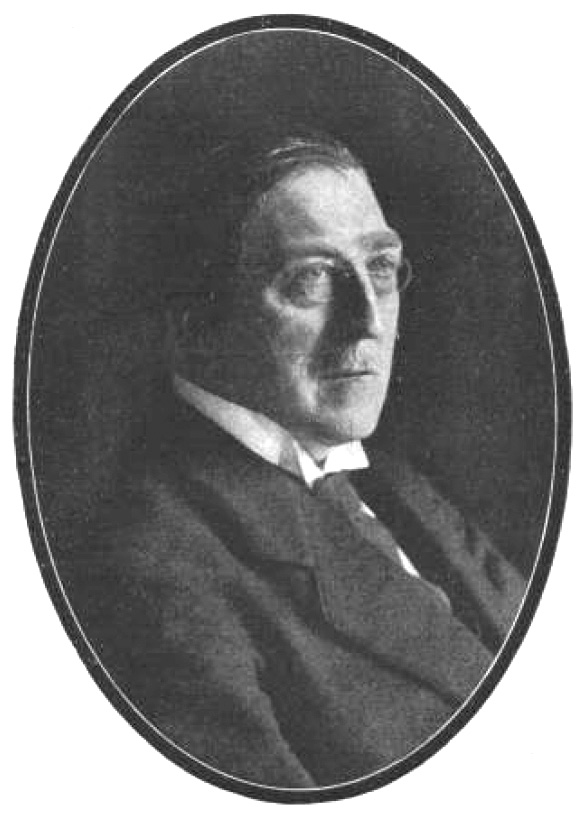
- Born: Paul Rudolf Eugen Jahnke; 30 November 1861; Berlin, Germany
- Died: 18 October 1921 (aged 57); Berlin, Germany
- Education: University of Berlin; Martin Luther University of Halle-Wittenberg
- Scientific career
- Fields: Mathematics
- Workplaces: Technische Universität Berlin
- Thesis: Zur Integration von Differentialgleichungen erster Ordnung, in Welchen die Unabhängige Veränderliche Explicite nicht Vorkommt, durch Eindeutige Doppeltperiodische Funktionen (1889)
- Doctoral advisor: Albert Wangerin

Paul Rudolf Eugen Jahnke (November 30, 1861, in Berlin – October 18, 1921, in Berlin) was a German mathematician.

Jahnke studied mathematics and physics at the University of Berlin, where he graduated in 1886. In 1889 he received his doctorate from Martin-Luther-Universität Halle-Wittenberg under Albert Wangerin on the integration of first-order ordinary differential equations. After that, he was a teacher at secondary schools in Berlin, where he simultaneously in 1901 taught at the Königlich Technische Hochschule Berlin (now TU Berlin) and in 1905 he became a professor at the Mining Academy in Berlin, which merged in 1916 with the Technische Hochschule. In 1919 he became rector of that institution.

In 1900 Jahnke read a paper at the International Congress of Mathematicians in Paris. He was editor of the Archives of Mathematics and Physics and contributor to the Yearbook for the Progress of Mathematics. He wrote an early book on vector calculus but is now known primarily for his function tables, which first appeared in 1909. This was also translated into English and was in print into the 1960s. Fritz Emde (Professor of Electrical Engineering at the University of Stuttgart) contributed to later editions, as did others.

== Selected works ==
- Jahnke: Zur Integration von Differentialgleichungen erster Ordnung, in welchen die unabhängige Veränderliche explicite nicht vorkommt, durch eindeutige doppeltperiodische Funktionen (dissertation), 1889
- Jahnke: Vorlesungen über die Vektorenrechnung – mit Anwendungen auf Geometrie, Mechanik und mathematische Physik (lectures on vector analysis, with applications to geometry, mechanics, and mathematical physics), Teubner 1905
- Jahnke (jointly with Fritz Emde): Funktionentafeln mit Formeln und Kurven (tables of functions with formulas and graphs), Teubner. 1909, 1933, 1945, 7. Auflage 1966, edited by Fritz Emde until his death in 1951 and later by Friedrich Lösch as "Tafeln höherer Funktionen". In America, published as Tables of Functions With Formulas and Curves by Eugene Jahnke and Fritz Emde, Dover June 1945
