= Bohr–Mollerup theorem =

Theorem in complex analysis

In mathematical analysis, the Bohr–Mollerup theorem is a theorem proved by the Danish mathematicians Harald Bohr and Johannes Mollerup. The theorem characterizes the gamma function, defined for x > 0 by

$$\Gamma(x)=\int_0^\infty t^{x-1} e^{-t}\,\mathrm{d}t$$

as the only positive function f , with domain on the interval x > 0, that simultaneously has the following three properties:

- f (1) = 1, and
- f (x + 1) = x f (x) for x > 0 and
- f is logarithmically convex.

A treatment of this theorem is in Artin's book The Gamma Function, which has been reprinted by the AMS in a collection of Artin's writings.

The theorem was first published in a textbook on complex analysis, as Bohr and Mollerup thought it had already been proved.

The theorem admits a far-reaching generalization to a wide variety of functions (that have convexity or concavity properties of any order).

== Statement ==
Bohr–Mollerup Theorem. Γ(x) is the only function that satisfies f (x + 1) = x f (x) with log( f (x)) convex and also with f (1) = 1.

== Proof ==
Let Γ(x) be a function with the assumed properties established above: Γ(x + 1) = xΓ(x) and log(Γ(x)) is convex, and Γ(1) = 1. From Γ(x + 1) = xΓ(x) we can establish

$$\Gamma(x+n)=(x+n-1)(x+n-2)(x+n-3)\cdots(x+1)x\Gamma(x)$$

The purpose of the stipulation that Γ(1) = 1 forces the Γ(x + 1) = xΓ(x) property to duplicate the factorials of the integers so we can conclude now that Γ(n) = (n − 1)! if n ∈ N and if Γ(x) exists at all. Because of our relation for Γ(x + n), if we can fully understand Γ(x) for 0 < x ≤ 1 then we understand Γ(x) for all values of x.

For x_{1}, x_{2}, the slope S(x_{1}, x_{2}) of the line segment connecting the points (x_{1}, log(Γ (x_{1}))) and (x_{2}, log(Γ (x_{2}))) is monotonically increasing in each argument with x_{1} < x_{2} since we have stipulated that log(Γ(x)) is convex. Thus, we know that

$$S(n-1,n) \leq S(n,n+x)\leq S(n,n+1)\quad\text{for all }x\in(0,1].$$

After simplifying using the various properties of the logarithm, and then exponentiating (which preserves the inequalities since the exponential function is monotonically increasing) we obtain

$$(n-1)^x(n-1)! \leq \Gamma(n+x)\leq n^x(n-1)!.$$

From previous work this expands to

$$(n-1)^x(n-1)! \leq (x+n-1)(x+n-2)\cdots(x+1)x\Gamma(x)\leq n^x(n-1)!,$$

and so

$$\frac{(n-1)^x(n-1)!}{(x+n-1)(x+n-2)\cdots(x+1)x} \leq \Gamma(x) \leq \frac{n^xn!}{(x+n)(x+n-1)\cdots(x+1)x}\left(\frac{n+x}{n}\right).$$

The last line is a strong statement. In particular, it is true for all values of n. That is Γ(x) is not greater than the right hand side for any choice of n and likewise, Γ(x) is not less than the left hand side for any other choice of n. Each single inequality stands alone and may be interpreted as an independent statement. Because of this fact, we are free to choose different values of n for the RHS and the LHS. In particular, if we keep n for the RHS and choose n + 1 for the LHS we get:

$$\begin{align}
\frac{((n+1)-1)^x((n+1)-1)!}{(x+(n+1)-1)(x+(n+1)-2)\cdots(x+1)x}&\leq \Gamma(x)\leq\frac{n^xn!}{(x+n)(x+n-1)\cdots(x+1)x}\left(\frac{n+x}{n}\right)\\
\frac{n^xn!}{(x+n)(x+n-1)\cdots(x+1)x}&\leq \Gamma(x)\leq\frac{n^xn!}{(x+n)(x+n-1)\cdots(x+1)x}\left(\frac{n+x}{n}\right)
\end{align}$$

It is evident from this last line that a function is being sandwiched between two expressions, a common analysis technique to prove various things such as the existence of a limit, or convergence. Let n → ∞:

$$\lim_{n\to\infty} \frac{n+x}{n} = 1$$

so the left side of the last inequality is driven to equal the right side in the limit and

$$\frac{n^xn!}{(x+n)(x+n-1)\cdots(x+1)x}$$

is sandwiched in between. This can only mean that

$$\lim_{n\to\infty}\frac{n^xn!}{(x+n)(x+n-1)\cdots(x+1)x} = \Gamma (x).$$

In the context of this proof this means that

$$\lim_{n\to\infty}\frac{n^xn!}{(x+n)(x+n-1)\cdots(x+1)x}$$

has the three specified properties belonging to Γ(x). Also, the proof provides a specific expression for Γ(x), that must hold if the characterizing properties are true. Therefore, there is no other function defined on $x>0$ with all the properties assigned to Γ(x).

The remaining loose end is the question of proving that Γ(x) makes sense for all x where

$$\lim_{n\to\infty}\frac{n^xn!}{(x+n)(x+n-1)\cdots(x+1)x}$$

exists. The problem is that our first double inequality

$$S(n-1,n)\leq S(n+x,n)\leq S(n+1,n)$$

was constructed with the constraint 0 < x ≤ 1. If, say, x > 1 then the fact that S is monotonically increasing would make S(n + 1, n) < S(n + x, n), contradicting the inequality upon which the entire proof is constructed. However,

$$\begin{align}
\Gamma(x+1)&= \lim_{n\to\infty}x\cdot\left(\frac{n^xn!}{(x+n)(x+n-1)\cdots(x+1)x}\right)\frac{n}{n+x+1}\\
\Gamma(x)&=\left(\frac{1}{x}\right)\Gamma(x+1)
\end{align}$$

which demonstrates how to bootstrap Γ(x) to all values of x where the limit is defined.

== See also ==
- Wielandt theorem
