= Double factorial =

Mathematical function

The fifteen different chord diagrams on six points, or equivalently the fifteen different perfect matchings on a six-vertex complete graph. These are counted by the double factorial 15 = (6 − 1)‼.

In mathematics, the double factorial, or semifactorial, n‼ of a positive integer n is the product of all the positive integers up to n that have the same parity (odd or even) as n. That is,

$$n!! = \prod_{k=0}^{\left\lceil\frac{n}{2}\right\rceil - 1} (n-2k) = n (n-2) (n-4) \cdots.$$

Restated, this says that for even n, the double factorial is
$$n!! = \prod_{k=1}^\frac{n}{2} (2k) = n(n-2)(n-4)\cdots 4\cdot 2 \,,$$
while for odd n it is
$$n!! = \prod_{k=1}^\frac{n+1}{2} (2k-1) = n(n-2)(n-4)\cdots 3\cdot 1 \,.$$
A few examples are:

- 1!! = 1 = 1,
- 2!! = 2 = 2,
- 3!! = 3 × 1 = 3,
- 4!! = 4 × 2 = 8,
- 5!! = 5 × 3 × 1 = 15,
- 6!! = 6 × 4 × 2 = 48,
- 7!! = 7 × 5 × 3 × 1 = 105.

Often, both 0!! and (−1)!! are considered empty products that evaluate to 1.

The sequence of double factorials for even n = 0, 2, 4, 6, 8,... starts as

1, 2, 8, 48, 384, 3840, 46080, 645120, ... (sequence A000165 in the OEIS)

The sequence of double factorials for odd n = 1, 3, 5, 7, 9,... starts as

1, 3, 15, 105, 945, 10395, 135135, ... (sequence A001147 in the OEIS)

The term odd factorial is sometimes used for the double factorial of an odd number.

There is another definition of double factorial, which can be evaluated for most complex numbers; see below.

== History and usage ==
In a 1902 paper, the physicist Arthur Schuster wrote:

The symbolical representation of the results of this paper is much facilitated by the introduction of a separate symbol for the product of alternate factors, $n \cdot n-2 \cdot n-4 \cdots 1$, if $n$ be odd, or $n \cdot n-2 \cdots 2$ if $n$ be odd [sic]. I propose to write $n!!$ for such products, and if a name be required for the product to call it the "alternate factorial" or the "double factorial".

Meserve (1948) states that the double factorial was originally introduced in order to simplify the expression of certain trigonometric integrals that arise in the derivation of the Wallis product. Double factorials also arise in expressing the volume of a hyperball and surface area of a hypersphere, and they have many applications in enumerative combinatorics. They occur in Student's t-distribution (1908), although Gosset did not use the double exclamation point notation.

== Relation to the factorial ==
Because the double factorial only involves about half the factors of the ordinary factorial, its value is not substantially larger than the square root of the factorial n!, and it is much smaller than the iterated factorial (n!)!.

The factorial of a positive n may be written as the product of two double factorials:
$$n! = n!! \cdot (n-1)!!\,,$$
and therefore
$$n!! = \frac{n!}{(n-1)!!} = \frac{(n+1)!}{(n+1)!!}\,,$$
where the denominator cancels the unwanted factors in the numerator. The last form also applies when n = 0.

For an even non-negative integer n = 2k with k ≥ 0, the double factorial may be expressed as
$$(2k)!! = 2^k k!\,.$$

For odd n = 2k − 1 with k ≥ 1, combining the two previous formulas yields
$$(2k-1)!! = \frac{(2k-1)!}{2^{k-1} (k-1)!} = \frac{(2k)!}{2^k k!}\,.$$
The last form also applies when k = 0, and can be written in terms of k-permutations of 2k or a falling factorial as
$$(2k-1)!! = \frac {_{2k}P_k} {2^k} = \frac {(2k)^{\underline k}} {2^k}\,.$$

== Applications in enumerative combinatorics ==
The fifteen different rooted binary trees (with unordered children) on a set of four labeled leaves, illustrating 15 = (2 × 4 − 3)‼ (see article text).

Double factorials are motivated by the fact that they occur frequently in enumerative combinatorics and other settings. For instance, n‼ for odd values of n counts

- Perfect matchings of the complete graph K_{n + 1} for odd n. In such a graph, any single vertex v has n possible choices of vertex that it can be matched to, and once this choice is made the remaining problem is one of selecting a perfect matching in a complete graph with two fewer vertices. For instance, a complete graph with four vertices a, b, c, and d has three perfect matchings: ab and cd, ac and bd, and ad and bc. Perfect matchings may be described in several other equivalent ways, including involutions without fixed points on a set of n + 1 items (permutations in which each cycle is a pair) or chord diagrams (sets of chords of a set of n + 1 points evenly spaced on a circle such that each point is the endpoint of exactly one chord, also called Brauer diagrams). The numbers of matchings in complete graphs, without constraining the matchings to be perfect, are instead given by the telephone numbers, which may be expressed as a summation involving double factorials.
- Stirling permutations, permutations of the multiset of numbers 1, 1, 2, 2, ..., k, k in which each pair of equal numbers is separated only by larger numbers, where k = (n + 1)/2. The two copies of k must be adjacent; removing them from the permutation leaves a permutation in which the maximum element is k − 1, with n positions into which the adjacent pair of k values may be placed. From this recursive construction, a proof that the Stirling permutations are counted by the double permutations follows by induction. Alternatively, instead of the restriction that values between a pair may be larger than it, one may also consider the permutations of this multiset in which the first copies of each pair appear in sorted order; such a permutation defines a matching on the 2k positions of the permutation, so again the number of permutations may be counted by the double permutations.
- Heap-ordered trees, trees with k + 1 nodes labeled 0, 1, 2, ... k, such that the root of the tree has label 0, each other node has a larger label than its parent, and such that the children of each node have a fixed ordering. An Euler tour of the tree (with doubled edges) gives a Stirling permutation, and every Stirling permutation represents a tree in this way.
- Unrooted binary trees with (n + 5)/2 labeled leaves. Each such tree may be formed from a tree with one fewer leaf, by subdividing one of the n tree edges and making the new vertex be the parent of a new leaf.
- Rooted binary trees with (n + 3)/2 labeled leaves. This case is similar to the unrooted case, but the number of edges that can be subdivided is even, and in addition to subdividing an edge it is possible to add a node to a tree with one fewer leaf by adding a new root whose two children are the smaller tree and the new leaf.

Callan (2009) and Dale & Moon (1993) list several additional objects with the same counting sequence, including "trapezoidal words" (numerals in a mixed radix system with increasing odd radixes), height-labeled Dyck paths, height-labeled ordered trees, "overhang paths", and certain vectors describing the lowest-numbered leaf descendant of each node in a rooted binary tree. For bijective proofs that some of these objects are equinumerous, see Rubey (2008) and Marsh & Martin (2011).

The even double factorials give the numbers of elements of the hyperoctahedral groups (signed permutations or symmetries of a hypercube)

== Asymptotics ==
Stirling's approximation for the factorial can be used to derive an asymptotic equivalent for the double factorial. In particular, since $n! \sim \sqrt{2 \pi n}\left(\frac{n}{e}\right)^n,$ one has as $n$ tends to infinity that

$$n!! \sim \begin{cases}
\displaystyle \sqrt{\pi n}\left(\frac{n}{e}\right)^{n/2} & \text{if } n \text{ is even}, \\[5pt]
\displaystyle \sqrt{2 n}\left(\frac{n}{e}\right)^{n/2} & \text{if } n \text{ is odd}.
\end{cases}$$

== Extensions ==
=== Negative arguments ===
The ordinary factorial, when extended to the gamma function, has a pole at each negative integer, preventing the factorial from being defined at these numbers. However, the double factorial of odd numbers may be extended to any negative odd integer argument by inverting its recurrence relation
$$n!! = n \times (n-2)!!$$
to give
$$n!! = \frac{(n+2)!!}{n+2}\,.$$
Using this inverted recurrence, (−1)!! = 1, (−3)!! = −1, and (−5)!! = 1/3; negative odd numbers with greater magnitude have fractional double factorials. In particular, when n is an odd number, this gives
$$(-n)!! \times n!! = (-1)^\frac{n-1}{2} \times n\,.$$

=== Complex arguments ===
Disregarding the above definition of n!! for even values of n, the double factorial for odd integers can be extended to most real and complex numbers z by noting that when z is a positive odd integer then

$$\begin{align}
z!!
&= z(z-2)\cdots 5 \cdot 3 \\[3mu]
&= 2^\frac{z-1}{2}\left(\frac z2\right)\left(\frac{z-2}2\right)\cdots \left(\frac{5}{2}\right) \left(\frac{3}{2}\right) \\[5mu]
&= 2^\frac{z-1}{2} \frac{\Gamma\left(\tfrac z2+1\right)}{\Gamma\left(\tfrac12+1\right)} \\[5mu]
&= \sqrt{\frac{2}{\pi}} 2^\frac{z}{2} \Gamma\left(\tfrac z2+1\right) \,,\end{align}$$
where $\Gamma(z)$ is the gamma function.

The final expression is defined for all complex numbers except the negative even integers, and its reciprocal is well defined for all complex numbers. This double factorial satisfies (z + 2)!! = (z + 2) · z!! everywhere it is defined. As with the gamma function that extends the ordinary factorial function, this double factorial function is logarithmically convex in the sense of the Bohr–Mollerup theorem. Asymptotically, $n!! \sim \sqrt{2 n^{n+1} e^{-n}}\,.$

The generalized formula $\sqrt{\frac{2}{\pi}} 2^\frac{z}{2} \Gamma\left(\tfrac z2+1\right)$ does not agree with the previous product formula for z!! for non-negative even integer values of z. Instead, this generalized formula implies the following alternative:
$$(2k)!! = \sqrt{\frac{2}{\pi}} 2^k \Gamma\left(k+1\right) = \sqrt{ \frac{2}{\pi} } \prod_{i=1}^k (2i) \,,$$
with the value for 0!! in this case being

- $0!! = \sqrt{ \frac{2}{\pi} } \approx 0.797\,884\,5608\dots$ (sequence A076668 in the OEIS).

Using this generalized formula as the definition, the volume of an n-dimensional hypersphere of radius R can be expressed as

$$V_n=\frac{2 \left(2\pi\right)^\frac{n-1}{2}}{n!!} R^n\,,$$
regardless of whether n is even or odd.

== Additional identities ==
For integer values of n,
$$\int_{0}^\frac{\pi}{2}\sin^n x\,dx=\int_{0}^\frac{\pi}{2}\cos^n x\,dx=\frac{(n-1)!!}{n!!}\times
\begin{cases}1 & \text{if } n \text{ is odd} \\ \frac{\pi}{2} & \text{if } n \text{ is even.}\end{cases}$$
Using instead the extension of the double factorial of odd numbers to complex numbers, the formula is
$$\int_{0}^\frac{\pi}{2}\sin^n x\,dx=\int_{0}^\frac{\pi}{2}\cos^n x\,dx=\frac{(n-1)!!}{n!!} \sqrt{\frac{\pi}{2}}\,.$$

Double factorials can also be used to evaluate integrals of more complicated trigonometric polynomials.

Double factorials of odd numbers are related to the gamma function by the identity:

$$(2n-1)!! = 2^n \cdot \frac{\Gamma\left(\frac{1}{2} + n\right)} {\sqrt{\pi}} = (-2)^n \cdot \frac{\sqrt{\pi}} { \Gamma\left(\frac{1}{2} - n\right)}\,.$$

Some additional identities involving double factorials of odd numbers are:

$$\begin{align}
(2n-1)!! &= \sum_{k=0}^{n-1} \binom{n}{k+1} (2k-1)!! (2n-2k-3)!! \\
&= \sum_{k=1}^{n} \binom{n}{k} (2k-3)!! (2(n-k)-1)!! \\
&= \sum_{k=0}^{n} \binom{2n-k-1}{k-1} \frac{(2k-1)(2n-k+1)}{k+1}(2n-2k-3)!! \\
&= \sum_{k=1}^{n} \frac{(n-1)!}{(k-1)!} k(2k-3)!!\,.
\end{align}$$

An approximation for the ratio of the double factorial of two consecutive integers is
$$\frac{(2n)!!}{(2n-1)!!} \approx \sqrt{\pi n}.$$
This approximation gets more accurate as n increases, which can be seen as a result of the Wallis Integral.

== Generalizations ==
=== Definitions ===
In the same way that the double factorial generalizes the notion of the single factorial, the following definition of the integer-valued multiple factorial functions (multifactorials), or α-factorial functions, extends the notion of the double factorial function for positive integers $\alpha$:

$$n!_{(\alpha)} = \begin{cases}
n \cdot (n-\alpha)!_{(\alpha)} & \text{ if } n > \alpha \,; \\
n & \text{ if } 1 \leq n \leq \alpha \,; \text{and} \\
(n+\alpha)!_{(\alpha)} / (n+\alpha) & \text{ if } n \leq 0 \text{ and is not a negative multiple of } \alpha \,.
\end{cases}$$

=== Alternative extension of the multifactorial ===
Alternatively, the multifactorial z!_{(α)} can be extended to most real and complex numbers z by noting that when z is one more than a positive multiple of the positive integer α then

$$\begin{align} z!_{(\alpha)} &= z(z-\alpha)\cdots (\alpha+1) \\
&= \alpha^\frac{z-1}{\alpha}\left(\frac{z}{\alpha}\right)\left(\frac{z-\alpha}{\alpha}\right)\cdots \left(\frac{\alpha+1}{\alpha}\right) \\
&= \alpha^\frac{z-1}{\alpha} \frac{\Gamma\left(\frac{z}{\alpha}+1\right)}{\Gamma\left(\frac{1}{\alpha}+1\right)}\,.
\end{align}$$
where $\Gamma(z)$ is the gamma function.

This last expression is defined much more broadly than the original. In the same way that z! is not defined for negative integers, and z‼ is not defined for negative even integers, z!_{(α)} is not defined for negative multiples of α. However, it is defined and satisfies (z+α)!_{(α)} = (z+α)·z!_{(α)} for all other complex numbers z. This definition is consistent with the earlier definition only for those integers z satisfying z ≡ 1 mod α. This version is logarithmically convex in the sense of the Bohr–Mollerup theorem.

In addition to extending z!_{(α)} to most complex numbers z, this definition has the feature of working for all positive real values of α. Furthermore, when α = 1, this definition is mathematically equivalent to the Π(z) function. Also, when α = 2, this definition is mathematically equivalent to the alternative extension of the double factorial.

=== Generalized Stirling numbers expanding the multifactorial functions ===
A class of generalized Stirling numbers of the first kind is defined for α > 0 by the following triangular recurrence relation:

$$\left[\begin{matrix} n \\ k \end{matrix} \right]_{\alpha}
= (\alpha n+1-2\alpha) \left[\begin{matrix} n-1 \\ k \end{matrix} \right]_{\alpha} + \left[\begin{matrix} n-1 \\ k-1 \end{matrix} \right]_{\alpha} + \delta_{n,0} \delta_{k,0}\,.$$

These generalized α-factorial coefficients then generate the distinct symbolic polynomial products defining the multiple factorial, or α-factorial functions, (x − 1)!_{(α)}, as

$$\begin{align}
(x-1|\alpha)^{\underline{n}} & := \prod_{i=0}^{n-1} \left(x-1-i\alpha\right) \\
& = (x-1)(x-1-\alpha)\cdots\bigl(x-1-(n-1)\alpha\bigr) \\
& = \sum_{k=0}^n \left[\begin{matrix} n \\ k \end{matrix} \right] (-\alpha)^{n-k} (x-1)^k \\
& = \sum_{k=1}^n \left[\begin{matrix} n \\ k \end{matrix} \right]_{\alpha} (-1)^{n-k} x^{k-1}\,.
\end{align}$$

The distinct polynomial expansions in the previous equations actually define the α-factorial products for multiple distinct cases of the least residues x ≡ n_{0} mod α for n_{0} ∈ {0, 1, 2, ..., α − 1}.

The generalized α-factorial polynomials, σ^{(α)}_{n}(x) where σ^{(1)}_{n}(x) ≡ σ_{n}(x), which generalize the Stirling convolution polynomials from the single factorial case to the multifactorial cases, are defined by

$$\sigma_n^{(\alpha)}(x) := \left[\begin{matrix} x \\ x-n \end{matrix} \right]_{(\alpha)} \frac{(x-n-1)!}{x!}$$

for 0 ≤ n ≤ x. These polynomials have a particularly nice closed-form ordinary generating function given by

$$\sum_{n \geq 0} x \cdot \sigma_n^{(\alpha)}(x) z^n = e^{(1-\alpha)z} \left(\frac{\alpha z e^{\alpha z}}{e^{\alpha z}-1}\right)^x\,.$$

Other combinatorial properties and expansions of these generalized α-factorial triangles and polynomial sequences are considered in Schmidt (2010).

=== Exact finite sums involving multiple factorial functions ===
Suppose that n ≥ 1 and α ≥ 2 are integer-valued. Then we can expand the next single finite sums involving the multifactorial, or α-factorial functions, (αn − 1)!_{(α)}, in terms of the Pochhammer symbol and the generalized, rational-valued binomial coefficients as

$$\begin{align}
(\alpha n-1)!_{(\alpha)} & = \sum_{k=0}^{n-1} \binom{n-1}{k+1} (-1)^k \times \left(\frac{1}{\alpha}\right)_{-(k+1)} \left(\frac{1}{\alpha}-n\right)_{k+1} \times \bigl(\alpha(k+1)-1\bigr)!_{(\alpha)} \bigl(\alpha(n-k-1)-1\bigr)!_{(\alpha)} \\
& = \sum_{k=0}^{n-1} \binom{n-1}{k+1} (-1)^k \times \binom{\frac{1}{\alpha}+k-n}{k+1} \binom{\frac{1}{\alpha}-1}{k+1} \times \bigl(\alpha(k+1)-1\bigr)!_{(\alpha)} \bigl(\alpha(n-k-1)-1\bigr)!_{(\alpha)}\,,
\end{align}$$

and moreover, we similarly have double sum expansions of these functions given by

$$\begin{align}
(\alpha n-1)!_{(\alpha)} & = \sum_{k=0}^{n-1} \sum_{i=0}^{k+1} \binom{n-1}{k+1} \binom{k+1}{i} (-1)^k \alpha^{k+1-i} (\alpha i-1)!_{(\alpha)} \bigl(\alpha(n-1-k)-1\bigr)!_{(\alpha)} \times (n-1-k)_{k+1-i} \\
& = \sum_{k=0}^{n-1} \sum_{i=0}^{k+1} \binom{n-1}{k+1} \binom{k+1}{i} \binom{n-1-i}{k+1-i} (-1)^k \alpha^{k+1-i} (\alpha i-1)!_{(\alpha)} \bigl(\alpha(n-1-k)-1\bigr)!_{(\alpha)} \times (k+1-i)!.
\end{align}$$

The first two sums above are similar in form to a known non-round combinatorial identity for the double factorial function when α := 2 given by Callan (2009).

$$(2n-1)!! = \sum_{k=0}^{n-1} \binom{n}{k+1} (2k-1)!! (2n-2k-3)!!.$$

Similar identities can be obtained via context-free grammars. Additional finite sum expansions of congruences for the α-factorial functions, (αn − d)!_{(α)}, modulo any prescribed integer h ≥ 2 for any 0 ≤ d < α are given by Schmidt (2018).
