= Wallis' integrals =

Family of mathematical integrals

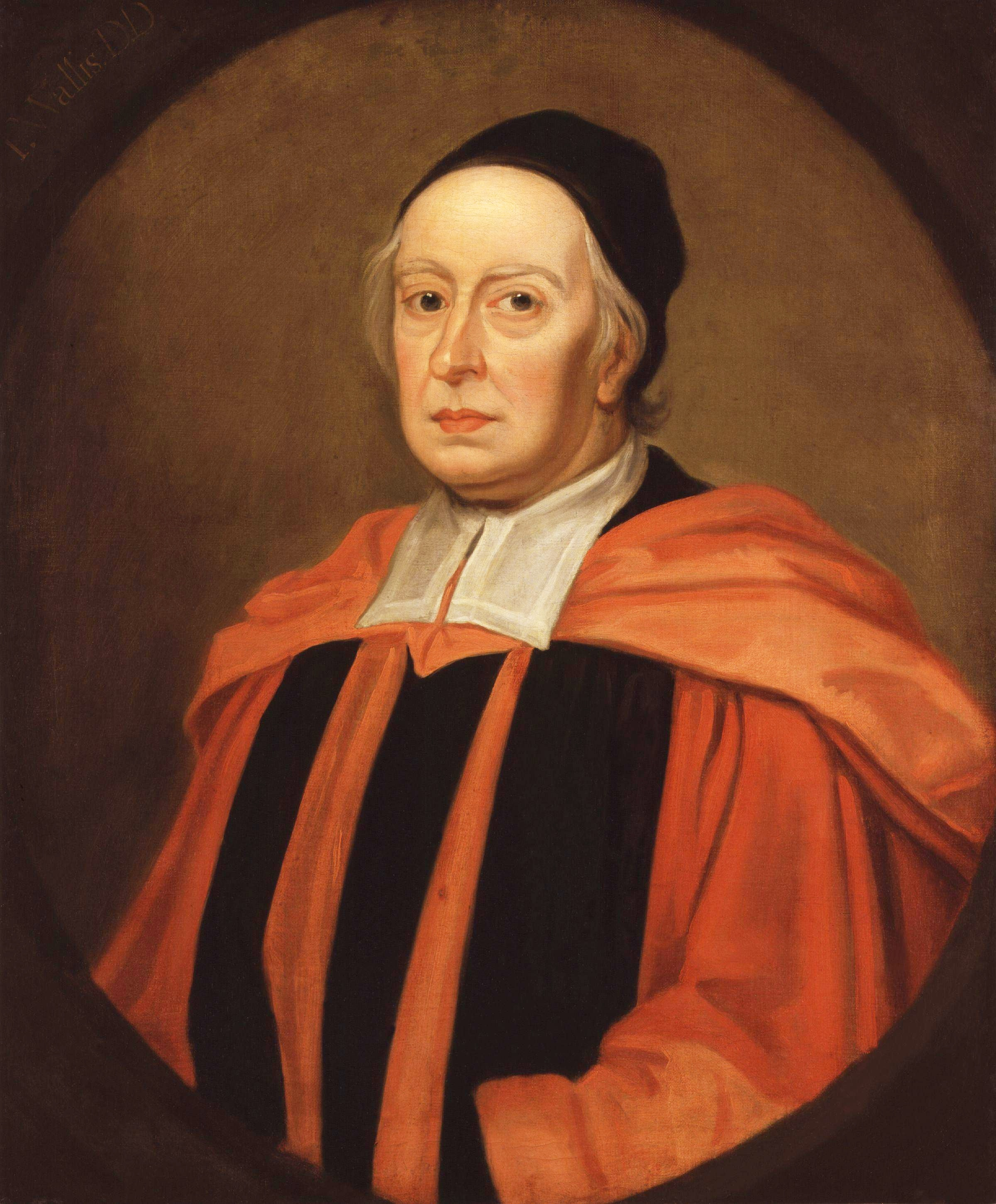
Portrait painting of John Wallis

In mathematics, and more precisely in analysis, the Wallis integrals constitute a family of integrals introduced by John Wallis.

== Definition, basic properties ==
The Wallis integrals are the terms of the sequence $(W_n)_{n \geq 0}$ defined by

$$W_n = \int_0^{\frac{\pi}{2}} \sin^n x \,dx,$$

or equivalently,

$$W_n = \int_0^{\frac{\pi}{2}} \cos^n x \,dx.$$

The first few terms of this sequence are:

| $W_0$ | $W_1$ | $W_2$ | $W_3$ | $W_4$ | $W_5$ | $W_6$ | $W_7$ | $W_8$ | ... | $W_n$ |
| $\frac{\pi}{2}$ | $1$ | $\frac{\pi}{4}$ | $\frac{2}{3}$ | $\frac{3\pi}{16}$ | $\frac{8}{15}$ | $\frac{5\pi}{32}$ | $\frac{16}{35}$ | $\frac{35\pi}{256}$ | ... | $\frac{n-1}{n} W_{n-2}$ |

The sequence $(W_n)$ is decreasing and has positive terms. In fact, for all $n \geq 0:$

- $W_n > 0,$ because it is an integral of a non-negative continuous function which is not identically zero;
- $W_n - W_{n+1} = \int_0^{\frac{\pi}{2}} \sin^n x\,dx - \int_0^{\frac{\pi}{2}} \sin^{n+1} x\,dx = \int_0^{\frac{\pi}{2}} (\sin^n x)(1 - \sin x )\,dx > 0,$ again because the last integral is of a non-negative continuous function.

Since the sequence $(W_n)$ is decreasing and bounded below by 0, it converges to a non-negative limit. Indeed, the limit is zero (see below).

== Recurrence relation ==
By means of integration by parts, a reduction formula can be obtained. Using the identity $\sin^2 x = 1 - \cos^2 x$, we have for all $n \geq 2$,

$$\begin{align}
\int_0^{\frac{\pi}{2}} \sin^n x \,dx &= \int_0^{\frac{\pi}{2}} (\sin^{n-2} x) (1-\cos^2 x) \,dx \\
&= \int_0^{\frac{\pi}{2}} \sin^{n-2} x \,dx - \int_0^{\frac{\pi}{2}} \sin^{n-2} x \cos^2 x \,dx.  \qquad\text{Equation (1)}
\end{align}$$

Integrating the second integral by parts, with:

- $v'(x)=\cos (x) \sin^{n-2}(x)$, whose anti-derivative is $v(x) = \frac{1}{n-1} \sin^{n-1}(x)$
- $u(x)=\cos (x)$, whose derivative is $u'(x) = - \sin(x),$

we have:

$$\int_0^{\frac{\pi}{2}} \sin^{n-2} x \cos^2 x \,dx = \left[ \frac{\sin^{n-1} x}{n-1} \cos x \right]_0^{\frac{\pi}{2}} + \frac{1}{n-1}\int_0^{\frac{\pi}{2}} \sin^{n-1} x \sin x \,dx = 0 + \frac{1}{n-1} W_n.$$

Substituting this result into equation (1) gives

$$W_n = W_{n-2} - \frac{1}{n-1} W_n,$$

and thus

$$W_n = \frac{n-1}{n} W_{n-2}, \qquad\text{Equation (2)}$$

for all $n \geq 2.$

This is a recurrence relation giving $W_n$ in terms of $W_{n-2}$. This, together with the values of $W_0$ and $W_1,$ give us two sets of formulae for the terms in the sequence $(W_n)$, depending on whether $n$ is odd or even:

- $W_{2p}=\frac{2p-1}{2p} \cdot \frac{2p-3}{2p-2} \cdots \frac{1}{2} W_0 = \frac{(2p-1)!!}{(2p)!!} \cdot \frac{\pi}{2} = \frac{(2p)!}{2^{2p} (p!)^2} \cdot \frac{\pi}{2},$
- $W_{2p+1}=\frac{2p}{2p+1} \cdot \frac{2p-2}{2p-1} \cdots \frac{2}{3} W_1 = \frac{(2p)!!}{(2p+1)!!} = \frac{2^{2p}(p!)^2}{(2p+1)!}.$

== Another relation to evaluate the Wallis' integrals ==
Wallis's integrals can be evaluated by using Euler integrals:

1. Euler integral of the first kind: the Beta function:
  $\Beta(x,y)= \int_0^1 t^{x-1}(1-t)^{y-1}\,dt =\frac{\Gamma(x)\Gamma(y)}{\Gamma(x+y)}$ for Re(x), Re(y) > 0
2. Euler integral of the second kind: the Gamma function:
  $\Gamma(z) = \int_0^\infty t^{z-1} e^{-t}\,dt$ for Re(z) > 0.

If we make the following substitution inside the Beta function:
$$\quad \left\{\begin{matrix}  t = \sin^2 u \\ 1-t = \cos^2 u \\ dt = 2\sin u\cos u du\end{matrix}\right.,$$
we obtain:

$$\Beta(a,b)= 2\int_0^{\frac{\pi}{2}} \sin^{2a-1} u\cos^{2b-1} u\,du,$$

so this gives us the following relation to evaluate the Wallis integrals:

$$W_n = \frac{1}{2} \Beta\left(\frac{n+1}{2},\frac{1}{2}\right)=\frac{\Gamma\left(\tfrac{n+1}{2}\right)\Gamma\left(\tfrac{1}{2}\right)}{2\,\Gamma\left(\tfrac{n}{2}+1\right)}.$$

So, for odd $n$, writing $n = 2p+1$, we have:

$$W_{2p+1}
=             \frac{\Gamma \left( p+1 \right)
\Gamma \left( \frac{1}{2} \right)
}{
2 \, \Gamma \left( p+1 + \frac{1}{2} \right)
}
=             \frac{p!
\Gamma \left( \frac{1}{2} \right)
}{
(2p+1) \, \Gamma \left( p + \frac{1}{2} \right)
}
=             \frac{2^p \; p!
}{
(2p+1)!!
}
=             \frac{2^{2\,p} \; (p!)^2
}{
(2p+1)!
},$$

whereas for even $n$, writing $n = 2p$ and knowing that $\Gamma\left(\tfrac{1}{2}\right)=\sqrt{\pi}$, we get :

$$W_{2p}
=             \frac{\Gamma \left( p + \frac{1}{2} \right)
\Gamma \left( \frac{1}{2} \right)
}{
2 \, \Gamma \left( p+1 \right)
}
=             \frac{(2p-1)!! \; \pi
}{
2^{p+1} \; p!
}
=             \frac{(2p)!
}{
2^{2\,p} \; (p!)^2
}
\cdot
\frac{\pi}{2}.$$

== Equivalence ==
- From the recurrence formula above $\mathbf{(2)}$, we can deduce that

$\ W_{n + 1} \sim W_n$ (equivalence of two sequences).

Indeed, for all $n \in\, \mathbb{N}$ :
$\ W_{n + 2} \leqslant W_{n + 1} \leqslant W_n$ (since the sequence is decreasing)
$\frac{W_{n + 2}}{W_n} \leqslant \frac{W_{n + 1}}{W_n} \leqslant 1$ (since $\ W_n > 0$)
$\frac{n + 1}{n + 2} \leqslant \frac{W_{n + 1}}{W_n} \leqslant 1$ (by equation $\mathbf{(2)}$).
By the sandwich theorem, we conclude that $\frac{W_{n + 1}}{W_n} \to 1$, and hence $\ W_{n + 1} \sim W_n$.

- By examining $W_nW_{n+1}$, one obtains the following equivalence:

$W_n \sim \sqrt{\frac{\pi}{2\, n}}\quad$ (and consequently $\lim_{n \rightarrow \infty} \sqrt n\,W_n=\sqrt{\pi /2}$ ).

Proof

For all $n \in\, \mathbb{N}$, let $u_n = (n + 1)\, W_n\, W_{n + 1}$.

It turns out that, $\forall n\in \N,\, u_{n + 1} = u_n$ because of equation $\mathbf{(2)}$. In other words $\ (u_n)$ is a constant.

It follows that for all $n \in\, \mathbb{N}$, $u_n = u_0 = W_0\, W_1 = \frac{\pi}{2}$.

Now, since $\ n + 1 \sim n$ and $\ W_{n + 1} \sim W_n$, we have, by the product rules of equivalents, $\ u_n \sim n\, W_n^2$.

Thus, $\ n\, W_n^2 \sim \frac{\pi}{2}$, from which the desired result follows (noting that $\ W_n > 0$).

== Deducing Stirling's formula ==
Suppose that we have the following equivalence (known as Stirling's formula):

$$n! \sim C \sqrt{n}\left(\frac{n}{e}\right)^n,$$

for some constant $C$ that we wish to determine. From above, we have

$W_{2p} \sim \sqrt{\frac{\pi}{4p}} = \frac{\sqrt{\pi}}{2\sqrt{p}}$ (equation (3))

Expanding $W_{2p}$ and using the formula above for the factorials, we get

$$\begin{align}
W_{2p} &= \frac{(2p)!}{2^{2p}(p!)^2}\cdot\frac{\pi}{2} \\
&\sim \frac{C \left(\frac{2p}{e}\right)^{2p} \sqrt{2p}}{2^{2p}C^2\left(\frac{p}{e}\right)^{2p}\left(\sqrt{p}\right)^2}\cdot\frac{\pi}{2} \\
&= \frac{\pi}{C\sqrt{2p}}. \text{ (equation (4))}
\end{align}$$

From (3) and (4), we obtain by transitivity:

$$\frac{\pi}{C\sqrt{2p}} \sim \frac{\sqrt{\pi}}{2\sqrt{p}}.$$

Solving for $C$ gives $C = \sqrt{2\pi}.$ In other words,

$$n! \sim \sqrt{2\pi n} \left(\frac{n}{e}\right)^n.$$

== Deducing the Double Factorial Ratio ==
Similarly, from above, we have:

$$W_{2p} \sim \sqrt{\frac{\pi}{4p}} = \frac{1}{2}\sqrt{\frac{\pi}{p}}.$$

Expanding $W_{2p}$ and using the formula above for double factorials, we get:

$$W_{2p} = \frac{(2p-1)!!}{(2p)!!} \cdot \frac{\pi}{2}  \sim \frac{1}{2}\sqrt{\frac{\pi}{p}}.$$

Simplifying, we obtain:

$$\frac{(2p-1)!!}{(2p)!!}  \sim \frac{1}{\sqrt{\pi \, p}},$$

or

$$\frac{(2p)!!}{(2p-1)!!}  \sim \sqrt{\pi\, p}.$$

== Evaluating the Gaussian Integral ==
The Gaussian integral can be evaluated through the use of Wallis' integrals.

We first prove the following inequalities:

- $\forall n\in \mathbb N^* \quad \forall u\in\mathbb R_+ \quad u\leqslant n\quad\Rightarrow\quad (1-u/n)^n\leqslant e^{-u}$
- $\forall n\in \mathbb N^* \quad \forall u \in\mathbb R_+ \qquad e^{-u} \leqslant (1+u/n)^{-n}$

In fact, letting $u/n=t$, the first inequality (in which $t \in [0,1]$) is equivalent to $1-t\leqslant e^{-t}$; whereas the second inequality reduces to $e^{-t}\leqslant (1+t)^{-1}$, which becomes $e^t\geqslant 1+t$. These 2 latter inequalities follow from the convexity of the exponential function (or from an analysis of the function $t \mapsto e^t -1 -t$).

Letting $u=x^2$ and making use of the basic properties of improper integrals (the convergence of the integrals is obvious), we obtain the inequalities:

$\int_0^{\sqrt n}(1-x^2/n)^n dx \leqslant \int_0^{\sqrt n} e^{-x^2} dx \leqslant \int_0^{+\infty} e^{-x^2} dx \leqslant \int_0^{+\infty} (1+x^2/n)^{-n} dx$ for use with the sandwich theorem (as $n \to \infty$).

The first and last integrals can be evaluated easily using Wallis' integrals. For the first one, let $x=\sqrt n\, \sin\,t$ (t varying from 0 to $\pi /2$). Then, the integral becomes $\sqrt n \,W_{2n+1}$. For the last integral, let $x=\sqrt n\, \tan\, t$ (t varying from $0$ to $\pi /2$). Then, it becomes $\sqrt n \,W_{2n-2}$.

As we have shown before, $\lim_{n\rightarrow +\infty} \sqrt n\;W_n=\sqrt{\pi /2}$. So, it follows that $\int_0^{+\infty} e^{-x^2} dx = \sqrt{\pi} /2$.

Remark: There are other methods of evaluating the Gaussian integral. Some of them are more direct.

== Note ==
The same properties lead to Wallis product, which expresses $\frac{\pi}{2}\,$ (see $\pi$) in the form of an infinite product.
