= Reduction formula =

A reduction formula is used to represent some expression in a simpler form.

It may refer to:

== Mathematics ==
- Formulas of reduction, the decomposition of multiple integrals
- Integration by reduction formulae, expressing an integral in terms of the same integral but in lower powers

== Physics ==
- LSZ reduction formula, a method to calculate S-matrix elements from the time-ordered correlation functions of a quantum field theory
