= Viète's formula =

Infinite product converging to 2/π

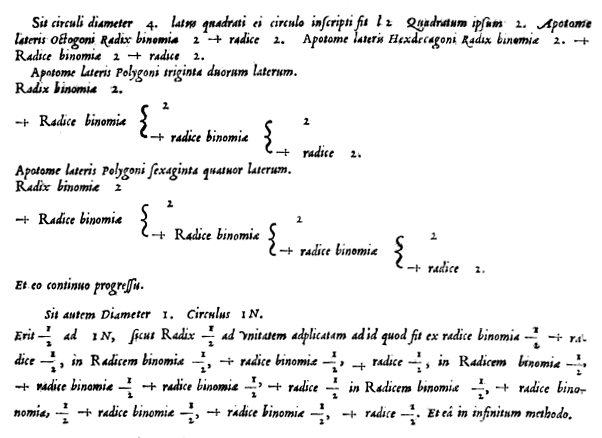
Viète's formula, as printed in Viète's Variorum de rebus mathematicis responsorum, liber VIII (1593)

In mathematics, Viète's formula is the following infinite product of nested radicals representing twice the reciprocal of the mathematical constant π:
$$\begin{align}
\frac2\pi &= \frac{\sqrt 2}2 \cdot \frac{\sqrt{2+\sqrt 2}}2 \cdot \frac{\sqrt{2+\sqrt{2+\sqrt 2}}}2 \cdots \\[5mu]
&= \sqrt\frac12 \cdot \sqrt{\frac12 + \frac12\sqrt\frac12} \cdot \sqrt{\frac12 + \frac12\sqrt{\frac12 + \frac12\sqrt\frac12}} \cdots
\end{align}$$

It can also be represented as
$$\frac2\pi = \prod_{n=1}^{\infty} \cos \frac{\pi}{2^{n+1}}.$$

The formula is named after François Viète, who published it in 1593. As the first formula of European mathematics to represent an infinite process, it can be given a rigorous meaning as a limit expression and marks the beginning of mathematical analysis. It has linear convergence and can be used for calculations of π, but other methods before and since have led to greater accuracy. It has also been used in calculations of the behavior of systems of springs and masses and as a motivating example for the concept of statistical independence.

The formula can be derived as a telescoping product of either the areas or perimeters of nested polygons converging to a circle. Alternatively, repeated use of the half-angle formula from trigonometry leads to a generalized formula, discovered by Leonhard Euler, that has Viète's formula as a special case. Many similar formulas involving nested roots or infinite products are now known.

== Significance ==
François Viète (1540–1603) was a French lawyer, privy councillor and code-breaker to two French kings, and amateur mathematician. He published this formula in 1593 in his work Variorum de rebus mathematicis responsorum, liber VIII. At this time, methods for approximating π to (in principle) arbitrary accuracy had long been known. Viète's own method can be interpreted as a variation of an idea of Archimedes of approximating the circumference of a circle by the perimeter of a many-sided polygon, used by Archimedes to find the approximation
$$\frac{223}{71} < \pi < \frac{22}{7}.$$

By publishing his method as a mathematical formula, Viète formulated the first instance of an infinite product known in mathematics, and the first example of an explicit formula for the exact value of π. As the first representation in European mathematics of a number as the result of an infinite process rather than of a finite calculation, Eli Maor highlights Viète's formula as marking the beginning of mathematical analysis and Jonathan Borwein calls its appearance "the dawn of modern mathematics".

Using his formula, Viète calculated π to an accuracy of nine decimal digits. However, this was not the most accurate approximation to π known at the time, as the Persian mathematician Jamshīd al-Kāshī had calculated π to an accuracy of nine sexagesimal digits and 16 decimal digits in 1424. Not long after Viète published his formula, Ludolph van Ceulen used a method closely related to Viète's to calculate 35 digits of π, which were published only after van Ceulen's death in 1610.

Beyond its mathematical and historical significance, Viète's formula can be used to explain the different speeds of waves of different frequencies in an infinite chain of springs and masses, and the appearance of π in the limiting behavior of these speeds. Additionally, a derivation of this formula as a product of integrals involving the Rademacher system, equal to the integral of products of the same functions, provides a motivating example for the concept of statistical independence.

== Interpretation and convergence ==
Viète's formula may be rewritten and understood as a limit expression
$$\lim_{n \rightarrow \infty} \prod_{i=1}^n \frac{a_i}{2} = \frac2\pi,$$
where
$$\begin{align} a_1 &= \sqrt{2} \\ a_i &= \sqrt{2+a_{i-1}}. \end{align}$$

For each choice of $n$, the expression in the limit is a finite product, and as $n$ gets arbitrarily large, these finite products have values that approach the value of Viète's formula arbitrarily closely. Viète did his work long before the concepts of limits and rigorous proofs of convergence were developed in mathematics; the first proof that this limit exists was not given until the work of Ferdinand Rudio in 1891.

Comparison of the convergence of Viète's formula (×) and several historical infinite series for π. S_{n} is the approximation after taking n terms. Each subsequent subplot magnifies the shaded area horizontally by 10 times.

The rate of convergence of a limit governs the number of terms of the expression needed to achieve a given number of digits of accuracy. In Viète's formula, the numbers of terms and digits are proportional to each other: the product of the first n terms in the limit gives an expression for π that is accurate to approximately 0.6n digits. This convergence rate compares very favorably with the Wallis product, a later infinite product formula for π. Although Viète himself used his formula to calculate π only with nine-digit accuracy, an accelerated version of his formula has been used to calculate π to hundreds of thousands of digits.

== Related formulas ==
Viète's formula may be obtained as a special case of a formula for the sinc function that has often been attributed to Leonhard Euler, more than a century later:
$$\frac{\sin x}{x} = \cos\frac{x}{2} \cdot \cos\frac{x}{4} \cdot \cos\frac{x}{8} \cdots$$

Substituting x = π/2 in this formula yields
$$\frac{2}{\pi} = \cos\frac{\pi}{4} \cdot \cos\frac{\pi}{8} \cdot \cos\frac{\pi}{16} \cdots$$

Then, expressing each term of the product on the right as a function of earlier terms using the half-angle formula:
$$\cos\frac{x}{2} = \sqrt\frac{1+\cos x}{2}$$
gives Viète's formula.

It is also possible to derive from Viète's formula a related formula for π that still involves nested square roots of two, but uses only one multiplication:
$$\pi = \lim_{k\to\infty} 2^{k} \underbrace{\sqrt{2-\sqrt{2+\sqrt{2+\sqrt{2+\sqrt{2+\cdots+\sqrt{2}}}}}}}_{k\text{ square roots}},$$
which can be rewritten compactly as
$$\begin{align}
\pi &= \lim_{k\to\infty} 2^k\sqrt{2-a_{k}}, \\
a_1 &= 0, \\
a_k &= \sqrt{2+a_{k-1}}.
\end{align}$$

Many formulae for π and other constants such as the golden ratio are now known, similar to Viète's in their use of either nested radicals or infinite products of trigonometric functions.

== Derivation ==
A sequence of regular polygons with numbers of sides equal to powers of two, inscribed in a circle. The ratios between areas or perimeters of consecutive polygons in the sequence give the terms of Viète's formula.

Viète obtained his formula by comparing the areas of regular polygons with 2^{n} and 2^{n + 1} sides inscribed in a circle. The first term in the product, $\sqrt{2}/2$ (before rationalization $1/\sqrt{2}$), is the ratio of areas of a square to an octagon, the second term is the ratio of areas of an octagon and a hexadecagon, etc. Thus, the product telescopes to give the ratio of areas of a square (the initial polygon in the sequence) to a circle (the limiting case of a 2^{n}-gon). Alternatively, the terms in the product may be instead interpreted as ratios of perimeters of the same sequence of polygons, starting with the ratio of perimeters of a digon (the diameter of the circle, counted twice) and a square, the ratio of perimeters of a square and an octagon, etc.

Another derivation is possible based on trigonometric identities and Euler's formula. Repeatedly applying the double-angle formula
$$\sin x = 2\sin\frac{x}{2}\cos\frac{x}{2},$$
leads to a proof by mathematical induction that, for all positive integers n,
$$\sin x = 2^n \sin\frac{x}{2^n}\biggl(\prod_{i=1}^n \cos\frac{x}{2^i}\biggr).$$

The term 2^{n} sin(x/2^{n}) goes to x in the limit as n goes to infinity, from which Euler's formula follows. Viète's formula may be obtained from this formula by the substitution x = π/2.

== See also ==
- Morrie's law, same identity taking $x=2^{n}\alpha$ on Viète's formula
- List of trigonometric identities
