= Wallis product =

Infinite product for pi

Comparison of the convergence of the Wallis product (purple asterisks) and several historical infinite series for π. S_{n} is the approximation after taking n terms. Each subsequent subplot magnifies the shaded area horizontally by 10 times. (click for detail)

The Wallis product is the infinite product representation of π:

$$\begin{align}
\frac{\pi}{2} & = \prod_{n=1}^{\infty} \frac{ 4n^2 }{ 4n^2 - 1 } = \prod_{n=1}^{\infty} \left(\frac{2n}{2n-1} \cdot \frac{2n}{2n+1}\right) \\[6pt]
& = \Big(\frac{2}{1} \cdot \frac{2}{3}\Big) \cdot \Big(\frac{4}{3} \cdot \frac{4}{5}\Big) \cdot \Big(\frac{6}{5} \cdot \frac{6}{7}\Big) \cdot \Big(\frac{8}{7} \cdot \frac{8}{9}\Big) \cdot \; \cdots \\
\end{align}$$

It was published in 1656 by John Wallis.

== Proof using integration ==
Wallis derived this infinite product using interpolation, though his method is not regarded as rigorous. A modern derivation can be found by examining $\int_0^\pi \sin^n x\,dx$ for even and odd values of $n$, and noting that for large $n$, increasing $n$ by 1 results in a change that becomes ever smaller as $n$ increases. Let

$$I(n) = \int_0^\pi \sin^n x\,dx.$$

(This is a form of Wallis' integrals.) Integrate by parts:

$$\begin{align}
u &= \sin^{n-1}x \\
\Rightarrow du &= (n-1) \sin^{n-2}x \cos x\,dx \\
dv &= \sin x\,dx \\
\Rightarrow v &= -\cos x
\end{align}$$

$$\begin{align}
\Rightarrow I(n) &=  \int_0^\pi \sin^n x\,dx \\[6pt]
{} &= -\sin^{n-1}x\cos x \Biggl|_0^\pi - \int_0^\pi (-\cos x)(n-1) \sin^{n-2}x \cos x\,dx \\[6pt]
{} &= 0 + (n-1) \int_0^\pi \cos^2x \sin^{n-2}x\,dx, \qquad n > 1 \\[6pt]
{} &= (n - 1) \int_0^\pi (1-\sin^2 x) \sin^{n-2}x\,dx \\[6pt]
{} &= (n - 1) \int_0^\pi \sin^{n-2}x\,dx - (n - 1) \int_0^\pi \sin^{n}x\,dx \\[6pt]
{} &= (n - 1) I(n-2)-(n-1) I(n) \\[6pt]
{} &= \frac{n-1}{n} I(n-2) \\[6pt]
\Rightarrow \frac{I(n)}{I(n-2)}
&= \frac{n-1}{n} \\[6pt]
\end{align}$$

Now, we make two variable substitutions for convenience to obtain:

$$I(2n) = \frac{2n-1}{2n}I(2n-2)$$
$$I(2n+1) = \frac{2n}{2n+1}I(2n-1)$$

We obtain values for $I(0)$ and $I(1)$ for later use.

$$\begin{align}
I(0)  &= \int_0^\pi dx = x\Biggl|_0^\pi = \pi \\[6pt]
I(1)  &= \int_0^\pi \sin x\,dx = -\cos x \Biggl|_0^\pi = (-\cos \pi)-(-\cos 0) = -(-1)-(-1) = 2 \\[6pt]
\end{align}$$

Now, we calculate for even values $I(2n)$ by repeatedly applying the recurrence relation result from the integration by parts. Eventually, we get to $I(0)$, which we have calculated.

$$I(2n)=\int_0^\pi \sin^{2n}x\,dx = \frac{2n-1}{2n}I(2n-2) = \frac{2n-1}{2n} \cdot \frac{2n-3}{2n-2}I(2n-4)$$

$$=\frac{2n-1}{2n} \cdot \frac{2n-3}{2n-2} \cdot \frac{2n-5}{2n-4} \cdot \cdots \cdot \frac{5}{6} \cdot \frac{3}{4} \cdot \frac{1}{2} I(0)=\pi \prod_{k=1}^n \frac{2k-1}{2k}$$

Repeating the process for odd values $I(2n+1)$,

$$I(2n+1)=\int_0^\pi \sin^{2n+1}x\,dx=\frac{2n}{2n+1}I(2n-1)=\frac{2n}{2n+1} \cdot \frac{2n-2}{2n-1}I(2n-3)$$

$$=\frac{2n}{2n+1} \cdot \frac{2n-2}{2n-1} \cdot \frac{2n-4}{2n-3} \cdot \cdots \cdot \frac{6}{7} \cdot \frac{4}{5} \cdot \frac{2}{3} I(1)=2 \prod_{k=1}^n \frac{2k}{2k+1}$$

We make the following observation, based on the fact that $\sin{x} \leq 1$

$$\sin^{2n+1}x \le \sin^{2n}x \le \sin^{2n-1}x, 0 \le x \le \pi$$

$$\Rightarrow I(2n+1) \le I(2n) \le I(2n-1)$$

Dividing by $I(2n+1)$:

$\Rightarrow 1 \le \frac{I(2n)}{I(2n+1)} \le \frac{I(2n-1)}{I(2n+1)}=\frac{2n+1}{2n}$, where the equality comes from our recurrence relation.

By the squeeze theorem,

$$\Rightarrow \lim_{n\rightarrow\infty} \frac{I(2n)}{I(2n+1)}=1$$

$$\lim_{n\rightarrow\infty} \frac{I(2n)}{I(2n+1)}=\frac{\pi}{2} \lim_{n\rightarrow\infty} \prod_{k=1}^n \left(\frac{2k-1}{2k} \cdot \frac{2k+1}{2k}\right)=1$$

$$\Rightarrow \frac{\pi}{2}=\prod_{k=1}^\infty \left(\frac{2k}{2k-1} \cdot \frac{2k}{2k+1}\right)=\frac{2}{1} \cdot \frac{2}{3} \cdot \frac{4}{3} \cdot \frac{4}{5} \cdot \frac{6}{5} \cdot \frac{6}{7} \cdot \cdots$$

=== Proof using Laplace's method ===
See the main page on Gaussian integral.

== Proof using Euler's infinite product for the sine function ==
While the proof above is typically featured in modern calculus textbooks, the Wallis product is, in retrospect, an easy corollary of the later Euler infinite product for the sine function.

$$\frac{\sin x}{x} = \prod_{n=1}^\infty\left(1 - \frac{x^2}{n^2\pi^2}\right)$$

Let $x = \frac{\pi}{2}$:

$$\begin{align}
\Rightarrow\frac{2}{\pi} &= \prod_{n=1}^\infty \left(1 - \frac{1}{4n^2}\right) \\[6pt]
\Rightarrow\frac{\pi}{2} &= \prod_{n=1}^\infty \left(\frac{4n^2}{4n^2 - 1}\right) \\[6pt]
&= \prod_{n=1}^\infty \left(\frac{2n}{2n-1}\cdot\frac{2n}{2n+1}\right) = \frac{2}{1} \cdot \frac{2}{3} \cdot \frac{4}{3} \cdot \frac{4}{5} \cdot \frac{6}{5} \cdot \frac{6}{7} \cdots
\end{align}$$

== Relation to Stirling's approximation ==
Stirling's approximation for the factorial function $n!$ asserts that

$$n! = \sqrt {2\pi n} {\left(\frac{n}{e}\right)}^n \left[1 + O\left(\frac{1}{n}\right) \right].$$

Consider now the finite approximations to the Wallis product, obtained by taking the first $k$ terms in the product

$$p_k = \prod_{n=1}^{k} \frac{2n}{2n - 1}\frac{2n}{2n + 1},$$

where $p_k$ can be written as

$$\begin{align}
p_k &= {1 \over {2k + 1}} \prod_{n=1}^{k} \frac{(2n)^4}{[(2n)(2n - 1)]^2} \\[6pt]
&= {1 \over {2k + 1}} \cdot {{2^{4k}\,(k!)^4} \over {[(2k)!]^2}}.
\end{align}$$

Substituting Stirling's approximation in this expression (both for $k!$ and $(2k)!$) one can deduce (after a short calculation) that $p_k$ converges to $\frac{\pi}{2}$ as $k \rightarrow \infty$.

== Derivative of the Riemann zeta function at zero ==
The Riemann zeta function and the Dirichlet eta function can be defined:

$$\begin{align}
\zeta(s) &= \sum_{n=1}^\infty \frac{1}{n^s}, \Re(s)>1 \\[6pt]
\eta(s)  &= (1-2^{1-s})\zeta(s) \\[6pt]
&= \sum_{n=1}^\infty \frac{(-1)^{n-1}}{n^s}, \Re(s)>0
\end{align}$$

Applying an Euler transform to the latter series, the following is obtained:

$$\begin{align}
\eta(s) &= \frac{1}{2}+\frac{1}{2} \sum_{n=1}^\infty (-1)^{n-1}\left[\frac{1}{n^s}-\frac{1}{(n+1)^s}\right], \Re(s)>-1 \\[6pt]
\Rightarrow \eta'(s) &= (1-2^{1-s})\zeta'(s)+2^{1-s} (\ln 2) \zeta(s) \\[6pt]
&= -\frac{1}{2} \sum_{n=1}^\infty (-1)^{n-1}\left[\frac{\ln n}{n^s}-\frac{\ln (n+1)}{(n+1)^s}\right], \Re(s)>-1
\end{align}$$

$$\begin{align}
\Rightarrow \eta'(0) &= -\zeta'(0) - \ln 2 = -\frac{1}{2} \sum_{n=1}^\infty (-1)^{n-1}\left[\ln n-\ln (n+1)\right] \\[6pt]
&= -\frac{1}{2} \sum_{n=1}^\infty (-1)^{n-1}\ln \frac{n}{n+1} \\[6pt]
&= -\frac{1}{2} \left(\ln \frac{1}{2} - \ln \frac{2}{3} + \ln \frac{3}{4} - \ln \frac{4}{5} + \ln \frac{5}{6} - \cdots\right) \\[6pt]
&=  \frac{1}{2} \left(\ln \frac{2}{1} + \ln \frac{2}{3} + \ln \frac{4}{3} + \ln \frac{4}{5} + \ln \frac{6}{5} + \cdots\right) \\[6pt]
&=  \frac{1}{2} \ln\left(\frac{2}{1}\cdot\frac{2}{3}\cdot\frac{4}{3}\cdot\frac{4}{5}\cdot\cdots\right) = \frac{1}{2} \ln\frac{\pi}{2} \\
\Rightarrow \zeta'(0) &= -\frac{1}{2} \ln\left(2 \pi\right)
\end{align}$$

== See also ==
- John Wallis, English mathematician who is given partial credit for the development of infinitesimal calculus and pi.
- Viète's formula, a different infinite product formula for $\pi$.
- Leibniz formula for π, an infinite sum that can be converted into an infinite Euler product for π.
- Wallis sieve
- The Pippenger product formula obtains e by taking roots of terms in the Wallis product.
