= Infinite expression =

In mathematics, an infinite expression is an expression in which some operators take an infinite number of arguments, or in which the nesting of the operators continues to an infinite depth. A generic concept for infinite expression can lead to ill-defined or self-inconsistent constructions (much like a set of all sets), but there are several instances of infinite expressions that are well-defined.

== Examples ==
Examples of well-defined infinite expressions are

- infinite sums, such as

$$\sum_{n=0}^\infty a_n = a_0 + a_1 + a_2 + \cdots \,$$

- infinite products, such as

$$\prod_{n=0}^\infty b_n = b_0 \times b_1 \times b_2 \times \cdots$$

- infinite nested radicals, such as

$$\sqrt{1+2\sqrt{1+3 \sqrt{1+\cdots}}}$$

- infinite power towers, such as

$$\sqrt{2}^{\sqrt{2}^{\sqrt{2}^{\cdot^{\cdot^{\cdot}}}}}$$

- infinite continued fractions, such as

$$c_0 + \underset{n=1}{\overset{\infty}{\mathrm K}} \frac{1}{c_n} = c_0 + \cfrac{1}{c_1 + \cfrac{1}{c_2 + \cfrac{1}{c_3 + \cfrac{1}{c_4 + \ddots}}}},$$

where the left hand side uses Gauss's Kettenbruch notation.

In infinitary logic, one can use infinite conjunctions and infinite disjunctions.

== Evaluation ==
Typically, the value of an infinite expression that is indexed by positive (or non-negative) integers is defined to be the limit of the sequence of values determined from computing the expression on a finite prefix of its terms. For example,
$$\sum_{n=1}^\infty a_n = \lim_{n \to \infty} \sum_{k=1}^{n} a_k$$
if the limit exists.

However there are also other ways to evaluate the value of an infinite expression and, when one or more of the limits do not exist or the limits that do exist give different values, the value of the infinite expression may be deemed ambiguous or not well-defined. If the limiting value for an infinite sum exists and has the same value regardless of the summation rule applied, the series is said to be absolutely convergent.

== See also ==
- Iterated binary operation
- Infinite word
- Decimal expansion
- Power series
- Infinite compositions of analytic functions
- Omega language
