= Morrie's law =

For angles in degrees, cos(20)*cos(40)*cos(80) equals 1/8

Morrie's law is a special trigonometric identity. Its name is due to the physicist Richard Feynman, who used to refer to the identity under that name. Feynman picked the name from that of Morrie Jacobs, a boy whom he knew during his childhood, and afterwards remembered it for all of his life.

== Identity and generalisation ==
$$\cos(20^\circ) \cdot \cos(40^\circ) \cdot \cos(80^\circ) = \frac{1}{8}.$$

It is a special case of the more general identity

$$2^n \cdot \prod_{k=0}^{n-1} \cos(2^k \alpha) = \frac{\sin(2^n \alpha)}{\sin(\alpha)}$$

with n = 3 and α = 20° and the fact that

$$\frac{\sin(160^\circ)}{\sin(20^\circ)} = \frac{\sin(180^\circ-20^\circ)}{\sin(20^\circ)} = 1,$$

since

$$\sin(180^\circ-x) = \sin(x).$$

== Similar identities ==
A similar identity for the sine function also holds:

$$\sin(20^\circ) \cdot \sin(40^\circ) \cdot \sin(80^\circ) = \frac{\sqrt 3}{8}.$$

Moreover, dividing the second identity by the first, the following identity is evident:

$$\tan(20^\circ) \cdot \tan(40^\circ) \cdot \tan(80^\circ) = \sqrt 3 = \tan(60^\circ).$$

== Proof ==
=== Geometric proof of Morrie's law ===
Regular nonagon $ABCDEFGHI$ with $O$ being the center of its circumcircle. Computing of the angles: $$\begin{align} 40^\circ&=\frac{360^\circ}{9} \\70^\circ&=\frac{180^\circ-40^\circ}{2}\\ \alpha&=180^\circ-90^\circ-70^\circ =20^\circ \\ \beta&=180^\circ -90^\circ-(70^\circ-\alpha)=40^\circ \\ \gamma&=140^\circ -\beta -\alpha=80^\circ \end{align}$$

Consider a regular nonagon $ABCDEFGHI$ with side length $1$ and let $M$ be the midpoint of $AB$, $L$ the midpoint $BF$ and $J$ the midpoint of $BD$. The inner angles of the nonagon equal $140^\circ$ and furthermore $\gamma=\angle FBM=80^\circ$, $\beta=\angle DBF=40^\circ$ and $\alpha=\angle CBD=20^\circ$ (see graphic). Applying the cosinus definition in the right angle triangles $\triangle BFM$, $\triangle BDL$ and $\triangle BCJ$ then yields the proof for Morrie's law:

$$\begin{align}
1&=|AB|\\
&=2\cdot|MB|\\
&=2\cdot|BF|\cdot\cos(\gamma)\\
&=2^2|BL|\cos(\gamma)\\
&=2^2\cdot|BD|\cdot\cos(\gamma)\cdot\cos(\beta)\\
&=2^3\cdot|BJ|\cdot\cos(\gamma)\cdot\cos(\beta) \\
&=2^3\cdot|BC|\cdot\cos(\gamma)\cdot\cos(\beta)\cdot\cos(\alpha) \\
&=2^3\cdot 1 \cdot\cos(\gamma)\cdot\cos(\beta)\cdot\cos(\alpha) \\
&=8\cdot\cos(80^\circ)\cdot\cos(40^\circ)\cdot\cos(20^\circ)
\end{align}$$

=== Algebraic proof of the generalised identity ===
Recall the double angle formula for the sine function

$$\sin(2 \alpha) = 2 \sin(\alpha) \cos(\alpha).$$

Solve for $\cos(\alpha)$

$$\cos(\alpha)=\frac{\sin(2 \alpha)}{2 \sin(\alpha)}.$$

It follows that:

$$\begin{align}
\cos(2 \alpha) & = \frac{\sin(4 \alpha)}{2 \sin(2 \alpha)} \\[6pt]
\cos(4 \alpha) & = \frac{\sin(8 \alpha)}{2 \sin(4 \alpha)} \\
& \,\,\,\vdots \\
\cos\left(2^{n-1} \alpha\right)
& = \frac{\sin\left(2^n \alpha\right)}{2 \sin\left(2^{n-1} \alpha\right)}.
\end{align}$$

Multiplying all of these expressions together yields:

$$\cos(\alpha) \cos(2 \alpha) \cos(4 \alpha) \cdots \cos\left(2^{n-1} \alpha\right) =
\frac{\sin(2 \alpha)}{2 \sin(\alpha)} \cdot
\frac{\sin(4 \alpha)}{2 \sin(2 \alpha)} \cdot
\frac{\sin(8 \alpha)}{2 \sin(4 \alpha)} \cdots
\frac{\sin\left(2^n \alpha\right)}{2 \sin\left(2^{n-1} \alpha\right)}.$$

The intermediate numerators and denominators cancel leaving only the first denominator, a power of 2 and the final numerator. Note that there are n terms in both sides of the expression. Thus,

$$\prod_{k=0}^{n-1} \cos\left(2^k \alpha\right) = \frac{\sin\left(2^n \alpha\right)}{2^n \sin(\alpha)},$$

which is equivalent to the generalization of Morrie's law.

== See also ==
- Viète's formula, same identity taking $\alpha=2^{-n} x$ on Morrie's law
- List of trigonometric identities
