= Infinite product =

Mathematical concept

In mathematics, for a sequence of complex numbers a_{1}, a_{2}, a_{3}, ... the infinite product

$$\prod_{n=1}^{\infty} a_n = a_1 a_2 a_3 \cdots$$

is defined to be the limit of the partial products a_{1}a_{2}...a_{n} as n increases without bound. The product is said to converge when the limit exists and is not zero. Otherwise the product is said to diverge. A limit of zero is treated specially in order to obtain results analogous to those for infinite sums. Some sources allow convergence to 0 if there are only a finite number of zero factors and the product of the non-zero factors is non-zero, but for simplicity we will not allow that here. If the product converges, then the limit of the sequence a_{n} as n increases without bound must be 1, while the converse is in general not true.

The best known examples of infinite products are probably some of the formulae for π, such as the following two products, respectively by Viète (Viète's formula, the first published infinite product in mathematics) and John Wallis (Wallis product):

$$\frac{2}{\pi} = \frac{ \sqrt{2} }{ 2 } \cdot \frac{ \sqrt{2 + \sqrt{2}} }{ 2 } \cdot \frac{ \sqrt{2 + \sqrt{2 + \sqrt{2}}} }{ 2 } \cdot \; \cdots = \prod_{n=1}^{\infty} \cos \frac{\pi}{2^{n+1}}$$
$$\frac{\pi}{2} = \left(\frac{2}{1} \cdot \frac{2}{3}\right) \cdot \left(\frac{4}{3} \cdot \frac{4}{5}\right) \cdot \left(\frac{6}{5} \cdot \frac{6}{7}\right) \cdot \left(\frac{8}{7} \cdot \frac{8}{9}\right) \cdot \; \cdots = \prod_{n=1}^{\infty} \left( \frac{ 4n^2 }{ 4n^2 - 1 } \right).$$

== Convergence criteria ==
The product of positive real numbers

$$\prod_{n=1}^{\infty} a_n$$

converges to a nonzero real number if and only if the sum

$$\sum_{n=1}^{\infty} \log(a_n)$$

converges. This allows the translation of convergence criteria for infinite sums into convergence criteria for infinite products. The same criterion applies to products of arbitrary complex numbers (including negative reals) if the logarithm is understood as a fixed branch of logarithm which satisfies $\ln(1) = 0$, with the provision that the infinite product diverges when infinitely many a_{n} fall outside the domain of $\ln$, whereas finitely many such a_{n} can be ignored in the sum.

If we define $a_n=1+p_n$, the bounds

$$1+\sum_{n=1}^{N} p_n \le \prod_{n=1}^{N} \left( 1 + p_n \right) \le \exp \left( \sum_{n=1}^{N}p_n \right)$$

show that the infinite product of a_{n} converges if the infinite sum of the p_{n} converges. This relies on the Monotone convergence theorem. We can show the converse by observing that, if $p_n \to 0$, then

$$\lim_{n \to \infty} \frac{\log(1+p_n)}{p_n} = \lim_{x\to 0} \frac{\log(1+x)}{x} = 1,$$

and by the limit comparison test it follows that the two series

$$\sum_{n=1}^\infty \log(1+p_n) \quad \text{and} \quad \sum_{n=1}^\infty p_n,$$

are equivalent meaning that either they both converge or they both diverge.

If the series $\sum_{n=1}^{\infty} \log(a_n)$ diverges to $-\infty$, then the sequence of partial products of the a_{n} converges to zero. The infinite product is said to diverge to zero.

For the case where the $p_n$ have arbitrary signs, the convergence of the sum $\sum_{n=1}^\infty p_n$ does not guarantee the convergence of the product $\prod_{n=1}^\infty (1+p_n)$. For example, if $p_n = \frac{(-1)^{n+1}}{\sqrt{n}}$, then $\sum_{n=1}^\infty p_n$ converges, but $\prod_{n=1}^\infty (1 + p_n)$ diverges to zero. However, if $\sum_{n=1}^\infty |p_n|$ is convergent, then the product $\prod_{n=1}^\infty (1+p_n)$ converges absolutely–that is, the factors may be rearranged in any order without altering either the convergence, or the limiting value, of the infinite product. Also, if $\sum_{n=1}^\infty |p_n|^2$ is convergent, then the sum $\sum_{n=1}^\infty p_n$ and the product $\prod_{n=1}^\infty (1+p_n)$ are either both convergent, or both divergent.

== Product representations of functions ==
One important result concerning infinite products is that every entire function f(z) (that is, every function that is holomorphic over the entire complex plane) can be factored into an infinite product of entire functions, each with at most a single root. In general, if f has a root of order m at the origin and has other complex roots at u_{1}, u_{2}, u_{3}, ... (listed with multiplicities equal to their orders), then

$$f(z) = z^m e^{\phi(z)} \prod_{n=1}^{\infty} \left(1 - \frac{z}{u_n} \right) \exp \left\lbrace \frac{z}{u_n} + \frac{1}{2}\left(\frac{z}{u_n}\right)^2 + \cdots + \frac{1}{\lambda_n} \left(\frac{z}{u_n}\right)^{\lambda_n} \right\rbrace$$

where λ_{n} are non-negative integers that can be chosen to make the product converge, and $\phi (z)$ is some entire function (which means the term before the product will have no roots in the complex plane). The above factorization is not unique, since it depends on the choice of values for λ_{n}. However, for most functions, there will be some minimum non-negative integer p such that λ_{n} = p gives a convergent product, called the canonical product representation. This p is called the rank of the canonical product. In the event that p = 0, this takes the form

$$f(z) = z^m e^{\phi(z)} \prod_{n=1}^{\infty} \left(1 - \frac{z}{u_n}\right).$$

This can be regarded as a generalization of the fundamental theorem of algebra, since for polynomials, the product becomes finite and $\phi (z)$ is constant.

In addition to these examples, the following representations are of special note:

| Function | Infinite product representation(s) | Notes |
|---|---|---|
| Simple pole | $$\begin{align} \frac{1}{1 - z} &= \prod_{n=1}^\infty e^{z^n/n} \\ &= \prod_{n=0}^\infty \left(1+z^{2^n}\right) \end{align}$$ | |
| Sinc function | $\frac{\sin \pi z}{\pi z} =\prod_{n=1}^{\infty} \left(1 - \frac{z^2}{n^2}\right)$ | This is due to Euler. Wallis' formula for π is a special case of this. |
| Reciprocal gamma function | $$\begin{align} \frac{1}{\Gamma(z)} &= z e^{\gamma z} \prod_{n=1}^{\infty} \left(1 + \frac{z}{n}\right) e^{-\frac{z}{n}} \\ &= z \prod_{n=1}^\infty \frac{1+\frac{z}{n}}{\left(1+\frac{1}{n}\right)^z} \end{align}$$ | Schlömilch |
| Weierstrass sigma function | $\sigma(z) = z\prod_{\omega \in \Lambda_{*}} \left(1-\frac{z}{\omega}\right)e^{\frac{z^2}{2\omega^2}+\frac{z}{\omega}}$ | Here $\Lambda_{*}$ is the lattice without the origin. |
| Q-Pochhammer symbol | $(z;q)_\infty = \prod_{n=0}^\infty (1-zq^n)$ | Widely used in q-analog theory. The Euler function is a special case. |
| Ramanujan theta function | $$\begin{align} f(a,b) &=\sum_{n=-\infty}^\infty a^{\frac{n(n+1)}{2}} b^{\frac{n(n-1)}{2}} \\ &= \prod_{n=0}^\infty (1+a^{n+1}b^n)(1+a^nb^{n+1})(1-a^{n+1}b^{n+1}) \end{align}$$ | An expression of the Jacobi triple product, also used in the expression of the Jacobi theta function |
| Riemann zeta function | $\zeta(z) = \prod_{n=1}^{\infty} \frac{1}{1 - p_n^{-z}}$ | Here p_{n} denotes the nth prime number. This is a special case of the Euler product. |

The last of these is not a product representation of the same sort discussed above, as ζ is not entire. Rather, the above product representation of ζ(z) converges precisely for Re(z) > 1, where it is an analytic function. By techniques of analytic continuation, this function can be extended uniquely to an analytic function (still denoted ζ(z)) on the whole complex plane except at the point z = 1, where it has a simple pole.

== See also ==
- Infinite products in trigonometry
- Iterated binary operation
- Infinite expression
- Infinite series
- Pentagonal number theorem
