= Integration by reduction formulae =

Integration technique using recurrence relations

In integral calculus, integration by reduction formulae is a method relying on recurrence relations. It is used when an expression containing an integer parameter, usually in the form of powers of elementary functions, or products of transcendental functions and polynomials of arbitrary degree, cannot be integrated directly. Using other methods of integration a reduction formula can be set up to obtain the integral of the same or similar expression with a lower integer parameter, progressively simplifying the integral until it can be evaluated. This method of integration is one of the earliest used.

== How to find the reduction formula ==
The reduction formula can be derived using any of the common methods of integration, like integration by substitution, integration by parts, integration by trigonometric substitution, integration by partial fractions, etc. The main idea is to express an integral involving an integer parameter (e.g. power) of a function, represented by I_{n}, in terms of an integral that involves a lower value of the parameter (lower power) of that function, for example I_{n-1} or I_{n-2}. This makes the reduction formula a type of recurrence relation. In other words, the reduction formula expresses the integral

$$I_n =\int f(x,n) \,\text{d}x,$$

in terms of

$$I_k =  \int f(x,k) \,\text{d}x,$$

where

$$k < n.$$

Reference works contain the general forms for recursive integration (see, for example Gradshteyn and Ryzhik).

== How to compute the integral ==
To compute the integral, we set n to its value and use the reduction formula to express it in terms of the (n – 1) or (n – 2) integral. The lower index integral can be used to calculate the higher index ones; the process is continued repeatedly until we reach a point where the function to be integrated can be computed, usually when its index is 0 or 1. Then we back-substitute the previous results until we have computed I_{n}.

=== Examples ===
Below are examples of the procedure.

==== Cosine integral ====
Typically, integrals like

$$\int \cos^n x \,\text{d}x , \,\!$$

can be evaluated by a reduction formula.

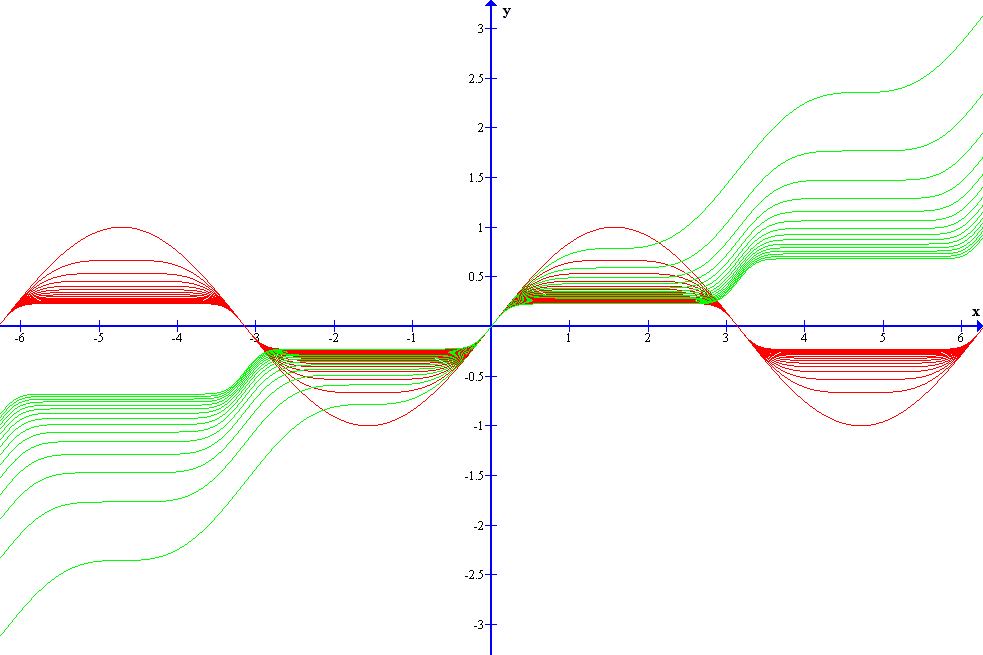
$\int \cos^n (x) \,\text{d}x\!$, for n = 1, 2 ... 30

Start by setting:

$$I_n = \int \cos^n x\,\text{d}x . \,\!$$

Now re-write as:

$$I_n = \int \cos^ {n-1} x \cos x \,\text{d}x , \,\!$$

Integrating by this substitution:

$$\cos x \,\text{d}x = \text{d} ( \sin x) , \,\!$$

$$I_n = \int \cos^{n-1} x \,\text{d}(\sin x) . \!$$

Now integrating by parts:

$$\begin{align} \int \cos^n x \,\text{d}x & = \int \cos^{n-1} x \,\text{d}(\sin x)  \! = \cos^{n-1} x \sin x - \int \sin x \,\text{d}(\cos^{n-1} x) \\
& = \cos^{n-1} x \sin x + (n-1) \int \sin x \cos^{n-2} x\sin x \,\text{d}x\\
& = \cos^{n-1} x \sin x + (n-1) \int \cos^{n-2} x \sin^2 x \,\text{d}x\\
& = \cos^{n-1} x \sin x + (n-1) \int \cos^{n-2} x (1-\cos^2 x )\,\text{d}x\\
& = \cos^{n-1} x \sin x + (n-1) \int \cos^{n-2} x \,\text{d}x - (n-1)\int \cos^n x \,\text{d}x\\
& = \cos^{n-1} x \sin x + (n-1) I_{n-2} - (n-1) I_n ,
\end{align} \,$$

solving for I_{n}:

$$I_n \ + (n-1) I_n\ = \cos^{n-1} x \sin x\ + \ (n-1) I_{n-2} , \,$$

$$n I_n\ = \cos^{n-1} (x) \sin x\ + (n-1) I_{n-2} , \,$$

$$I_n \ = \frac{1}{n}\cos^{n-1} x \sin x\ + \frac{n-1}{n} I_{n-2} , \,$$

so the reduction formula is:

$$\int \cos^n x \,\text{d}x\ = \frac{1}{n}\cos^{n-1} x \sin x + \frac{n-1}{n} \int \cos^{n-2} x \,\text{d}x . \!$$

To supplement the example, the above can be used to evaluate the integral for (say) n = 5;

$$I_5 = \int \cos^5 x \,\text{d}x . \,\!$$

Calculating lower indices:

$$n=5, \quad I_5 = \tfrac{1}{5} \cos^4 x \sin x + \tfrac{4}{5} I_3 , \,$$

$$n=3, \quad I_3 = \tfrac{1}{3} \cos^2 x \sin x + \tfrac{2}{3} I_1, \,$$

back-substituting:

$$\because I_1\ = \int \cos x \,\text{d}x = \sin x + C_1,\,$$

$$\therefore I_3\ = \tfrac{1}{3} \cos^2 x \sin x + \tfrac{2}{3}\sin x + C_2, \quad C_2\ = \tfrac{2}{3} C_1,\,$$

$$I_5\ = \frac{1}{5} \cos^4 x \sin x + \frac{4}{5}\left[\frac{1}{3} \cos^2 x \sin x + \frac{2}{3} \sin x\right] + C,\,$$

where C is a constant.

==== Exponential integral ====
Another typical example is:

$$\int x^n e^{ax} \,\text{d}x . \,\!$$

Start by setting:

$$I_n = \int x^n e^{ax} \,\text{d}x . \,\!$$

Integrating by substitution:

$$x^n \,\text{d}x = \frac{\text{d} ( x^{n+1})}{n+1} , \,\!$$

$$I_n = \frac{1}{n+1} \int e^{ax} \,\text{d}(x^{n+1}) , \!$$

Now integrating by parts:

$$\begin{align} \int e^{ax} \,\text{d}(x^{n+1}) & = x^{n+1}e^{ax} - \int x^{n+1} \,\text{d}(e^{ax}) \\
& = x^{n+1}e^{ax} - a \int x^{n+1} e^{ax}\,\text{d}x ,
\end{align} \!$$

$$(n+1) I_n = x^{n+1}e^{ax} - a I_{n+1} , \!$$

shifting indices back by 1 (so n + 1 → n, n → n – 1):

$$n I_{n-1} = x^ne^{ax} - a I_n , \!$$

solving for I_{n}:

$$I_n = \frac{1}{a} \left ( x^ne^{ax} - n I_{n-1} \right ) , \,\!$$

so the reduction formula is:

$$\int x^n e^{ax} \,\text{d}x = \frac{1}{a} \left ( x^ne^{ax} - n \int x^{n-1} e^{ax} \,\text{d}x \right ). \!$$

An alternative way in which the derivation could be done starts by substituting $e^{ax}$.

Integration by substitution:

$e^{ax} \,\text{d}x = \frac{\text{d} ( e^{ax})}{a} , \,\!$

$I_n = \frac{1}{a} \int x^{n} \,\text{d}(e^{ax}) , \!$

Now integrating by parts:

$$\begin{align} \int x^{n} \,\text{d}(e^{ax}) & = x^{n}e^{ax} - \int e^{ax} \,\text{d}(x^{n}) \\
& = x^{n}e^{ax} - n \int e^{ax} x^{n-1}\,\text{d}x ,
\end{align} \!$$

which gives the reduction formula when substituting back:

$I_n = \frac{1}{a} \left ( x^ne^{ax} - n I_{n-1} \right ) , \,\!$

which is equivalent to:

$$\int x^n e^{ax} \,\text{d}x = \frac{1}{a} \left ( x^ne^{ax} - n \int x^{n-1} e^{ax} \,\text{d}x \right ). \!$$

Another alternative way in which the derivation could be done by integrating by parts:

$$I_n = \int x^{n} x e^{ax} \,\text{d}x, \!$$

$$u = x^{n} \text{ , }\ dv = e^{ax} ,$$

$$\frac{du} {dx}\ = nx^{n-1} \text{ , }\ v = \frac{e^{ax}}{a}\$$

$$I_n = \frac{x^{n}e^{ax}}{a}\ - \int nx^{n-1}\ \frac{e^{ax}}{a}\ \text{d}x\$$

$$I_n = \frac{x^{n}e^{ax}}{a}\ - \frac{n}{a}\ \int x^{n-1} e^{ax} \ \text{d}x\$$

Remember:

$$I_{n-1} = \int x^{n-1} e^{ax} \ \text{d}x\$$

$$\therefore\ I_n = \frac{x^{n}e^{ax}}{a}\ - \frac{n}{a}\ I_{n-1}$$

which gives the reduction formula when substituting back:

$$I_n = \frac{1}{a} \left ( x^ne^{ax} - n I_{n-1} \right ) , \,\!$$

which is equivalent to:

$$\int x^n e^{ax} \,\text{d}x = \frac{1}{a} \left ( x^ne^{ax} - n \int x^{n-1} e^{ax} \,\text{d}x \right ). \!$$

== Tables of integral reduction formulas ==
=== Rational functions ===
The following integrals contain:

- Factors of the linear radical $\sqrt{ax+b}\,\!$
- Linear factors ${px+q}\,\!$ and the linear radical $\sqrt{ax+b}\,\!$
- Quadratic factors $x^2+a^2\,\!$
- Quadratic factors $x^2-a^2\,\!$, for $x>a\,\!$
- Quadratic factors $a^2-x^2\,\!$, for $x<a\,\!$
- (Irreducible) quadratic factors $ax^2+bx+c\,\!$
- Radicals of irreducible quadratic factors $\sqrt{ax^2+bx+c}\,\!$

Integral	Reduction formula
$I_n = \int \frac{x^n}{\sqrt{ax+b}} \,\text{d}x\,\!$	$I_n = \frac{2x^n\sqrt{ax+b}}{a(2n+1)} - \frac{2nb}{a(2n+1)} I_{n-1}\,\!$
$I_n = \int \frac{\text{d}x}{x^n\sqrt{ax+b}}\,\!$	$I_n = -\frac{\sqrt{ax+b}}{(n-1)bx^{n-1}}-\frac{a(2n-3)}{2b(n-1)}I_{n-1}\,\!$
$I_n = \int x^n\sqrt{ax+b}\,\text{d}x\,\!$	$I_n = \frac{2x^n\sqrt{(ax+b)^3}}{a(2n+3)}-\frac{2nb}{a(2n+3)}I_{n-1}\,\!$
$I_{m,n} = \int \frac{\text{d}x}{(ax+b)^m(px+q)^n}\,\!$	$$I_{m,n} = \begin{cases} -\frac{1}{(n-1)(bp-aq)} \left [ \frac{1}{(ax+b)^{m-1}(px+q)^{n-1}}+a(m+n-2)I_{m,n-1} \right ]   \\ \frac{1}{(m-1)(bp-aq)} \left [ \frac{1}{(ax+b)^{m-1}(px+q)^{n-1}}+p(m+n-2)I_{m-1,n} \right ] \end{cases}\,\!$$
$I_{m,n} = \int \frac{(ax+b)^m}{(px+q)^n} \,\text{d}x\,\!$	$$I_{m,n} = \begin{cases} -\frac{1}{(n-1)(bp-aq)}\left [ \frac{(ax+b)^{m+1}}{(px+q)^{n-1}}+a(n-m-2)I_{m,n-1} \right ]   \\ -\frac{1}{(n-m-1)p}\left [ \frac{(ax+b)^m}{(px+q)^{n-1}}+m(bp-aq)I_{m-1,n} \right ]  \\ -\frac{1}{(n-1)p}\left [ \frac{(ax+b)^m}{(px+q)^{n-1}}-amI_{m-1,n-1} \right ] \end{cases}\,\!$$

Integral	Reduction formula
$I_n=\int \frac{(px+q)^n}{\sqrt{ax+b}} \,\text{d}x\,\!$	$\int (px+q)^n\sqrt{ax+b} \,\text{d}x = \frac{2(px+q)^{n+1}\sqrt{ax+b}}{p(2n+3)}+\frac{bp-aq}{p(2n+3)}I_n\,\!$ $I_n=\frac{2(px+q)^n\sqrt{ax+b}}{a(2n+1)}+\frac{2n(aq-bp)}{a(2n+1)}I_{n-1}\,\!$
$I_n=\int \frac{\text{d}x}{(px+q)^n\sqrt{ax+b}}\,\!$	$\int \frac{\sqrt{ax+b}}{(px+q)^n}\,\text{d}x = -\frac{\sqrt{ax+b}}{p(n-1)(px+q)^{n-1}}+\frac{a}{2p(n-1)}I_{n}\,\!$ $I_n= -\frac{\sqrt{ax+b}}{(n-1)(aq-bp)(px+q)^{n-1}}+\frac{a(2n-3)}{2(n-1)(aq-bp)}I_{n-1}\,\!$

Integral	Reduction formula
$I_n= \int \frac{\text{d}x}{(x^2+a^2)^n}\,\!$	$I_n= \frac{x}{2a^2(n-1)(x^2+a^2)^{n-1}}+\frac{2n-3}{2a^2(n-1)}I_{n-1}\,\!$
$I_{n,m}= \int \frac{\text{d}x}{x^m(x^2+a^2)^n}\,\!$	$a^2I_{n,m}= I_{m,n-1}-I_{m-2,n}\,\!$
$I_{n,m}= \int \frac{x^m}{(x^2+a^2)^n} \,\text{d}x\,\!$	$I_{n,m}= I_{m-2,n-1}-a^2I_{m-2,n}\,\!$

Integral	Reduction formula
$I_n= \int \frac{\text{d}x}{(x^2-a^2)^n}\,\!$	$I_n= -\frac{x}{2a^2(n-1)(x^2-a^2)^{n-1}}-\frac{2n-3}{2a^2(n-1)}I_{n-1}\,\!$
$I_{n,m}= \int \frac{\text{d}x}{x^m(x^2-a^2)^n}\,\!$	${a^2}I_{n,m}= I_{m-2,n}-I_{m,n-1}\,\!$
$I_{n,m}= \int \frac{x^m}{(x^2-a^2)^n} \,\text{d}x\,\!$	$I_{n,m}= I_{m-2,n-1}+a^2I_{m-2,n}\,\!$

Integral	Reduction formula
$I_n= \int \frac{\text{d}x}{(a^2-x^2)^n}\,\!$	$I_n= \frac{x}{2a^2(n-1)(a^2-x^2)^{n-1}}+\frac{2n-3}{2a^2(n-1)}I_{n-1}\,\!$
$I_{n,m}= \int \frac{\text{d}x}{x^m(a^2-x^2)^n}\,\!$	${a^2}I_{n,m}= I_{m,n-1}+I_{m-2,n}\,\!$
$I_{n,m}= \int \frac{x^m}{(a^2-x^2)^n} \,\text{d}x\,\!$	$I_{n,m}= a^2I_{m-2,n}-I_{m-2,n-1}\,\!$

Integral	Reduction formula
$I_n = \int \frac{\text{d}x}{{x^n}(ax^2+bx+c)}\,\!$	$-cI_n =\frac{1}{x^{n-1}(n-1)}+ bI_{n-1}+aI_{n-2}\,\!$
$I_{m,n}=\int \frac{x^m \,\text{d}x}{(ax^2+bx+c)^n}\,\!$	$I_{m,n}= -\frac{x^{m-1}}{a(2n-m-1)(ax^2+bx+c)^{n-1}} - \frac{b(n-m)}{a(2n-m-1)}I_{m-1,n} + \frac{c(m-1)}{a(2n-m-1)}I_{m-2,n}\,\!$
$I_{m,n}= \int \frac{\text{d}x}{x^m(ax^2+bx+c)^n}\,\!$	$-c(m-1)I_{m,n}= \frac{1}{x^{m-1}(ax^2+bx+c)^{n-1}}+{a(m+2n-3)}I_{m-2,n}+{b(m+n-2)}I_{m-1,n}\,\!$

Integral	Reduction formula
$I_n = \int (ax^2+bx+c)^n\,\text{d}x\,\!$	$8a(n+1)I_{n+\frac{1}{2}} = 2(2ax+b)(ax^2+bx+c)^{n+\frac{1}{2}} + (2n+1)(4ac-b^2)I_{n-\frac{1}{2}}\,\!$
$I_n = \int \frac{1}{(ax^2+bx+c)^n}\,\text{d}x\,\!$	$(2n-1)(4ac-b^2)I_{n+\frac{1}{2}} = \frac{2(2ax+b)}{(ax^2+bx+c)^{n-\frac{1}{2}}}+{8a(n-1)}I_{n-\frac{1}{2}}\,\!$

Note that by the laws of indices:

$$I_{n+\frac{1}{2}} =  I_{\frac{2n+1}{2}} =\int \frac{1}{(ax^2+bx+c)^{\frac{2n+1}{2}}}\,\text{d}x = \int \frac{1}{\sqrt{(ax^2+bx+c)^{2n+1}}}\,\text{d}x\,\!$$

=== Transcendental functions ===
The following integrals contain:

- Factors of sine
- Factors of cosine
- Factors of sine and cosine products and quotients
- Products/quotients of exponential factors and powers of x
- Products of exponential and sine/cosine factors

Integral	Reduction formula
$I_n=\int x^n \sin{ax} \,\text{d}x\,\!$	$a^2I_n=-ax^n \cos{ax} + nx^{n-1} \sin{ax} - n(n-1) I_{n-2} \,\!$
$J_n=\int x^n \cos{ax} \,\text{d}x \,\!$	$a^2J_n=ax^n \sin{ax} + nx^{n-1} \cos{ax} - n(n-1) J_{n-2} \,\!$
$I_n = \int \frac{\sin{ax}}{x^n} \,\text{d}x\,\!$ $J_n = \int \frac{\cos{ax}}{x^n} \,\text{d}x \,\!$	$I_n = -\frac{\sin{ax}}{(n-1)x^{n-1}}+\frac{a}{n-1}J_{n-1}\,\!$ $J_n = -\frac{\cos{ax}}{(n-1)x^{n-1}}-\frac{a}{n-1}I_{n-1}\,\!$ the formulae can be combined to obtain separate equations in I_{n}: $J_{n-1} = -\frac{\cos{ax}}{(n-2)x^{n-2}}-\frac{a}{n-2}I_{n-2}\,\!$ $I_n = -\frac{\sin{ax}}{(n-1)x^{n-1}}-\frac{a}{n-1}\left [\frac{\cos{ax}}{(n-2)x^{n-2}}+\frac{a}{n-2}I_{n-2}\right ] \,\!$ $\therefore I_n = -\frac{\sin{ax}}{(n-1)x^{n-1}}-\frac{a}{(n-1)(n-2)}\left (\frac{\cos{ax}}{x^{n-2}}+aI_{n-2}\right ) \,\!$ and J_{n}: $I_{n-1} = -\frac{\sin{ax}}{(n-2)x^{n-2}}+\frac{a}{n-2}J_{n-2}\,\!$ $J_n = -\frac{\cos{ax}}{(n-1)x^{n-1}}-\frac{a}{n-1}\left [-\frac{\sin{ax}}{(n-2)x^{n-2}}+\frac{a}{n-2}J_{n-2} \right ]\,\!$ $\therefore J_n = -\frac{\cos{ax}}{(n-1)x^{n-1}}-\frac{a}{(n-1)(n-2)}\left (-\frac{\sin{ax}}{x^{n-2}}+aJ_{n-2} \right )\,\!$
$I_n = \int \sin^n{ax} \,\text{d}x\,\!$	$anI_n = -\sin^{n-1}{ax}\cos{ax}+a(n-1)I_{n-2}\,\!$
$J_n = \int \cos^n{ax} \,\text{d}x\,\!$	$anJ_n = \sin{ax}\cos^{n-1}{ax}+a(n-1)J_{n-2}\,\!$
$I_n = \int \frac{\text{d}x}{\sin^n{ax}}\,\!$	$(n-1)I_n = - \frac{\cos{ax}}{a\sin^{n-1}{ax}}+ (n-2)I_{n-2}\,\!$
$J_n = \int \frac{\text{d}x}{\cos^n{ax}}\,\!$	$(n-1)J_n = \frac{\sin{ax}}{a\cos^{n-1}{ax}}+ (n-2)J_{n-2}\,\!$

Integral	Reduction formula
$I_{m,n} = \int \sin^m{ax}\cos^n{ax}\,\text{d}x\,\!$	$$I_{m,n} = \begin{cases} -\frac{\sin^{m-1}{ax}\cos^{n+1}{ax}}{a(m+n)}+\frac{m-1}{m+n}I_{m-2,n} \\ \frac{\sin^{m+1}{ax}\cos^{n-1}{ax}}{a(m+n)}+\frac{n-1}{m+n}I_{m,n-2} \\ \end{cases}\,\!$$
$I_{m,n} = \int \frac{\text{d}x}{\sin^m{ax}\cos^n{ax}}\,\!$	$$I_{m,n} = \begin{cases} \frac{1}{a(n-1)\sin^{m-1}{ax}\cos^{n-1}{ax}}+\frac{m+n-2}{n-1}I_{m,n-2} \\ -\frac{1}{a(m-1)\sin^{m-1}{ax}\cos^{n-1}{ax}}+\frac{m+n-2}{m-1}I_{m-2,n} \\ \end{cases}\,\!$$
$I_{m,n} = \int \frac{\sin^m{ax}}{\cos^n{ax}}\,\text{d}x\,\!$	$$I_{m,n} = \begin{cases} \frac{\sin^{m-1}{ax}}{a(n-1)\cos^{n-1}{ax}}-\frac{m-1}{n-1}I_{m-2,n-2} \\ \frac{\sin^{m+1}{ax}}{a(n-1)\cos^{n-1}{ax}}-\frac{m-n+2}{n-1}I_{m,n-2} \\ -\frac{\sin^{m-1}{ax}}{a(m-n)\cos^{n-1}{ax}}+\frac{m-1}{m-n}I_{m-2,n} \\ \end{cases}\,\!$$
$I_{m,n} = \int \frac{\cos^m{ax}}{\sin^n{ax}}\,\text{d}x\,\!$	$$I_{m,n} = \begin{cases} -\frac{\cos^{m-1}{ax}}{a(n-1)\sin^{n-1}{ax}}-\frac{m-1}{n-1}I_{m-2,n-2} \\ -\frac{\cos^{m+1}{ax}}{a(n-1)\sin^{n-1}{ax}}-\frac{m-n+2}{n-1}I_{m,n-2} \\ \frac{\cos^{m-1}{ax}}{a(m-n)\sin^{n-1}{ax}}+\frac{m-1}{m-n}I_{m-2,n} \\ \end{cases}\,\!$$

Integral	Reduction formula
$I_{n} = \int x^n e^{ax}\,\text{d}x\,\!$ $n > 0\,\!$	$I_{n} = \frac{x^n e^{ax}}{a} - \frac{n}{a}I_{n-1} \,\!$
$I_{n} = \int x^{-n} e^{ax} \,\text{d}x\,\!$ $n > 0\,\!$ $n \neq 1\,\!$	$I_{n} = \frac{- e^{ax}}{(n-1)x^{n-1}} + \frac{a}{n-1}I_{n-1} \,\!$
$I_{n} = \int e^{ax} \sin^n{bx} \,\text{d}x\,\!$	$I_{n} = \frac{e^{ax} \sin^{n-1}{bx}}{a^2+(bn)^2}\left ( a\sin bx - bn\cos bx \right ) + \frac{n(n-1)b^2}{a^2+(bn)^2}I_{n-2} \,\!$
$I_{n} = \int e^{ax} \cos^n{bx} \,\text{d}x\,\!$	$I_{n} = \frac{e^{ax} \cos^{n-1}{bx}}{a^2+(bn)^2}\left ( a\cos bx + bn\sin bx \right ) + \frac{n(n-1)b^2}{a^2+(bn)^2}I_{n-2} \,\!$

== Bibliography ==
- Anton, Bivens, Davis, Calculus, 7th edition.
