= List of zeta functions =

In mathematics, a zeta function is (usually) a function analogous to the original example, the Riemann zeta function

$$\zeta(s) = \sum_{n=1}^\infty \frac 1 {n^s}.$$

Zeta functions include:

- Airy zeta function, related to the zeros of the Airy function
- Arakawa–Kaneko zeta function
- Arithmetic zeta function
- Artin–Mazur zeta function of a dynamical system
- Barnes zeta function or double zeta function
- Beurling zeta function of Beurling generalized primes
- Dedekind zeta function of a number field
- Duursma zeta function of error-correcting codes
- Epstein zeta function of a quadratic form
- Goss zeta function of a function field
- Hasse–Weil zeta function of a variety
- Height zeta function of a variety
- Hurwitz zeta function, a generalization of the Riemann zeta function
- Igusa zeta function
- Ihara zeta function of a graph
- L-function, a "twisted" zeta function
- Lefschetz zeta function of a morphism
- Lerch zeta function, a generalization of the Riemann zeta function
- Local zeta function of a characteristic-p variety
- Matsumoto zeta function
- Minakshisundaram–Pleijel zeta function of a Laplacian
- Motivic zeta function of a motive
- Multiple zeta function, or Mordell–Tornheim zeta function of several variables
- p-adic zeta function of a p-adic number
- Prime zeta function, like the Riemann zeta function, but only summed over primes
- Riemann zeta function, the archetypal example
- Riemann–Siegel zeta function, or Hardy zeta function, alternative names for the Z function
- Ruelle zeta function
- Selberg zeta function of a Riemann surface
- Shimizu L-function
- Shintani zeta function
- Subgroup zeta function
- Witten zeta function of a Lie group
- Zeta function of an incidence algebra, a function that maps every interval of a poset to the constant value 1. Despite not resembling a holomorphic function, the special case for the poset of integer divisibility is related as a formal Dirichlet series to the Riemann zeta function.
- Zeta function of an operator or spectral zeta function

== See also ==
Other functions called zeta functions, but not analogous to the Riemann zeta function

- Jacobi zeta function
- Weierstrass zeta function

Topics related to zeta functions

- Apéry's constant
- Artin conjecture
- Basel problem
- Birch and Swinnerton-Dyer conjecture
- Riemann hypothesis and the generalized Riemann hypothesis
- Selberg class
- Explicit formulae for L-functions
- Trace formula
