= Universal function =

A universal function is a function that can, in some defined way, imitate all other functions. This occurs in several contexts:

- In computer science, a universal function is a computable function capable of calculating any other computable function. It is shown to exist by the UTM theorem.
- In cryptography, a universal one-way function is a function that is known to be one-way if one-way functions exist.
- In mathematics, a universal function is one that contains subregions that approximate every holomorphic function to arbitrary accuracy. The Riemann zeta function (and some others) have this property, as described in Zeta function universality.
