= Arakawa–Kaneko zeta function =

In mathematics, the Arakawa–Kaneko zeta function is a generalisation of the Riemann zeta function which generates special values of the polylogarithm function.

== Definition ==
The zeta function $\xi_k(s)$ is defined by

$$\xi_k(s) = \frac{1}{\Gamma(s)} \int_0^{+\infty} \frac{t^{s-1}}{e^t-1}\mathrm{Li}_k(1-e^{-t}) \, dt \$$

where Li_{k} is the k-th polylogarithm

$$\mathrm{Li}_k(z) = \sum_{n=1}^{\infty} \frac{z^n}{n^k} \ .$$

== Properties ==
The integral converges for $\Re(s) > 0$ and $\xi_k(s)$ has analytic continuation to the whole complex plane as an entire function.

The special case k = 1 gives $\xi_1(s) = s \zeta(s+1)$ where $\zeta$ is the Riemann zeta-function.

The special case s = 1 remarkably also gives $\xi_k(1) = \zeta(k+1)$ where $\zeta$ is the Riemann zeta-function.

The values at integers are related to multiple zeta function values by

$$\xi_k(m) = \zeta_m^*(k,1,\ldots,1)$$

where

$$\zeta_n^*(k_1,\dots,k_{n-1},k_n)=\sum_{0<m_1<m_2<\cdots<m_n}\frac{1}{m_1^{k_1}\cdots m_{n-1}^{k_{n-1}}m_n^{k_n}} \ .$$
