= Lefschetz zeta function =

In mathematics, the Lefschetz zeta-function is a tool used in topological periodic and fixed point theory, and dynamical systems. Given a continuous map $f\colon X\to X$, the zeta-function is defined as the formal series

$$\zeta_f(t) = \exp \left( \sum_{n=1}^\infty L(f^n) \frac{t^n}{n} \right),$$

where $L(f^n)$ is the Lefschetz number of the $n$-th iterate of $f$. This zeta-function is of note in topological periodic point theory because it is a single invariant containing information about all iterates of $f$.

== Examples ==
The identity map on $X$ has Lefschetz zeta function

$$\frac{1}{(1-t)^{\chi(X)}},$$

where $\chi(X)$ is the Euler characteristic of $X$, i.e., the Lefschetz number of the identity map.

For a less trivial example, let $X = S^1$ be the unit circle, and let $f\colon S^1\to S^1$ be reflection in the x-axis, that is, $f(\theta) = -\theta$. Then $f$ has Lefschetz number 2, while $f^2$ is the identity map, which has Lefschetz number 0. Likewise, all odd iterates have Lefschetz number 2, while all even iterates have Lefschetz number 0. Therefore, the zeta function of $f$ is

$$\begin{align}
\zeta_f(t) & = \exp \left( \sum_{n=1}^\infty \frac{2t^{2n+1}}{2n+1} \right) \\
&=\exp \left( \left\{2\sum_{n=1}^\infty \frac{t^n}{n}\right\} -\left \{2 \sum_{n=1}^\infty\frac{t^{2n}}{2n}\right\} \right) \\
&=\exp \left(-2\log(1-t)+\log(1-t^2)\right)\\
&=\frac{1-t^2}{(1-t)^2} \\
&=\frac{1+t}{1-t}
\end{align}$$

== Formula ==
If f is a continuous map on a compact manifold X of dimension n (or more generally any compact polyhedron), the zeta function is given by the formula

$$\zeta_f(t)=\prod_{i=0}^{n}\det(1-t f_\ast|H_i(X,\mathbf{Q}))^{(-1)^{i+1}}.$$

Thus it is a rational function. The polynomials occurring in the numerator and denominator are essentially the characteristic polynomials of the map induced by f on the various homology spaces.

== Connections ==
This generating function is essentially an algebraic form of the Artin–Mazur zeta function, which gives geometric information about the fixed and periodic points of f.

== See also ==
- Lefschetz fixed-point theorem
- Artin–Mazur zeta function
- Ruelle zeta function
