= Karen Brucks =

American mathematician (1957–2017)

Karen Marie Brucks
- Born: February 1, 1957; Chicago, Illinois, U.S.
- Died: July 8, 2017 (60)
- Education: University of Arizona (BS); University of North Texas (MS & PHD)
- Occupation: Mathematician
- Known for: Advocacy of women in mathematics.
- Scientific career
- Fields: Mathematics
- Institutions: Michigan State University; Stony Brook University; University of Wisconsin–Milwaukee

Karen Marie Brucks (February 1, 1957 – July 8, 2017) was an American mathematician known for her research in topological dynamics, and for her advocacy of women in mathematics. She worked for many years as a faculty member and administrator at the University of Wisconsin–Milwaukee.

== Life ==
Brucks was born on February 1, 1957, in Chicago. She majored in mathematics at the University of Arizona, graduating in 1980. Next, she earned a master's degree in 1982 at the University of North Texas, and continued there for doctoral study, completing her Ph.D. in 1988. Her doctoral dissertation, Dynamics of One Dimensional Maps, was supervised by R. Daniel Mauldin.

After postdoctoral positions at Michigan State University and Stony Brook University, she became a faculty member at the University of Wisconsin–Milwaukee in 1991, eventually serving for 24 years there. She was a Fulbright Scholar in 1997–1998, on a research visit to Hungary. At the University of Wisconsin–Milwaukee, she chaired the mathematics department for four years, from 2001 to 2005, and spent seven years as Associate Dean of Natural Sciences, beginning in 2008.

She retired as associate professor emeritus in 2015, and died on July 8, 2017.

== Research ==
Brucks's research primarily concerned dynamical systems, and particularly systems operating on one-dimensional intervals, including and applications of Milnor–Thurston kneading theory to unimodal maps on intervals such as the tent map, logistic map, and adding machines. With Henk Bruin she authored the book Topics from one-dimensional dynamics, published in 2004 by the Cambridge University Press as volume 62 of their London Mathematical Society Student Texts series.

== Advocacy ==
Brucks was a regular instructor in a National Science Foundation summer program for undergraduate women in mathematics, beginning in 1997. She also served on the advisory board for the University of Wisconsin–Milwaukee Women in Mathematics, Science, and Engineering Program, and was active in leadership in the American Association of University Women, Association for Women in Mathematics, and American Mathematical Society.
