= Zeta function universality =

Zeta-like functions approximate arbitrary holomorphic functions

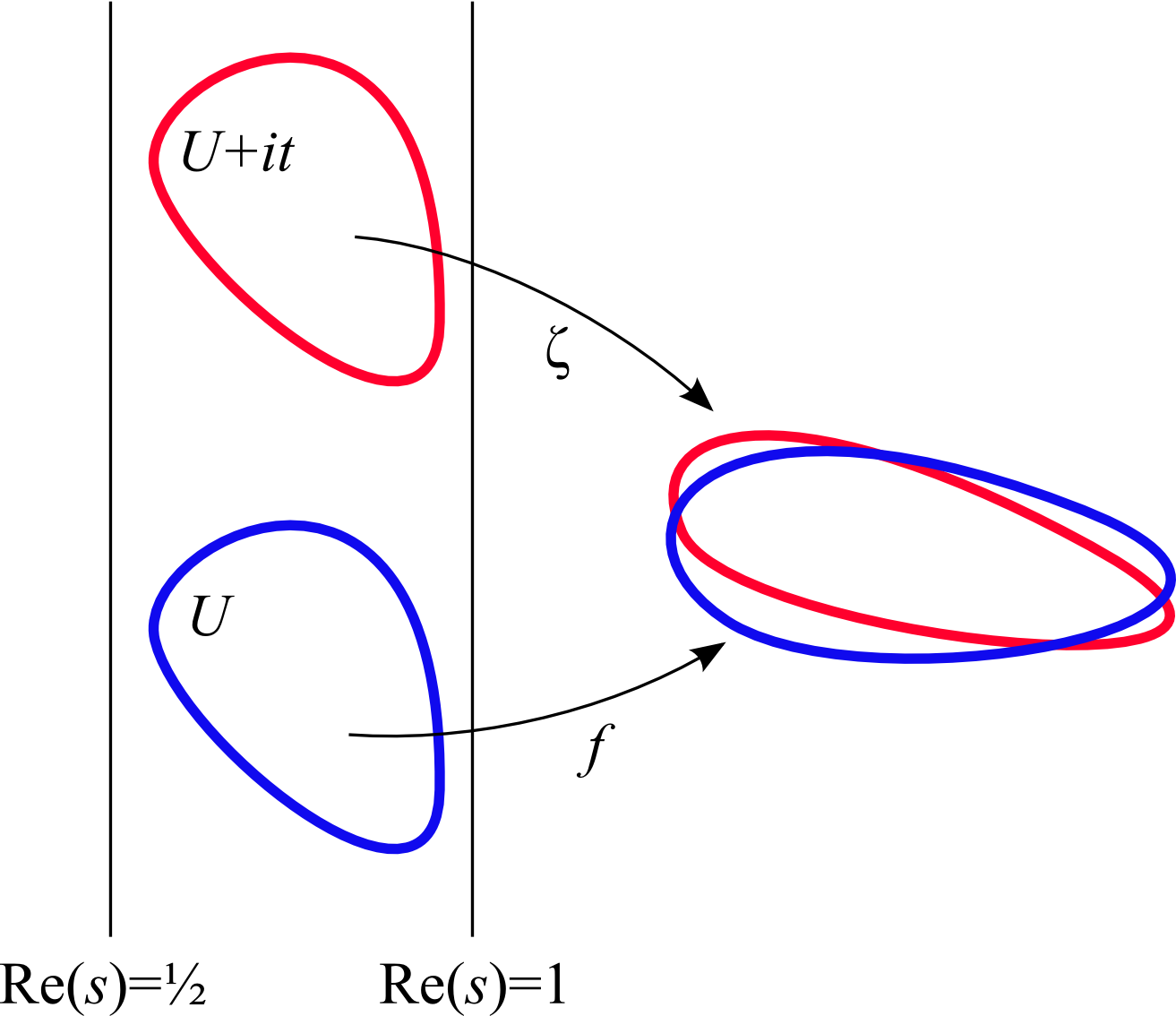
Any non-vanishing holomorphic function f defined on the strip can be approximated by the ζ-function.

In mathematics, the universality of zeta functions is the remarkable ability of the Riemann zeta function and other similar functions (such as the Dirichlet L-functions) to approximate arbitrary non-vanishing holomorphic functions arbitrarily well.

The universality of the Riemann zeta function was first proven by Sergei Mikhailovitch Voronin in 1975 and is sometimes known as Voronin's universality theorem.

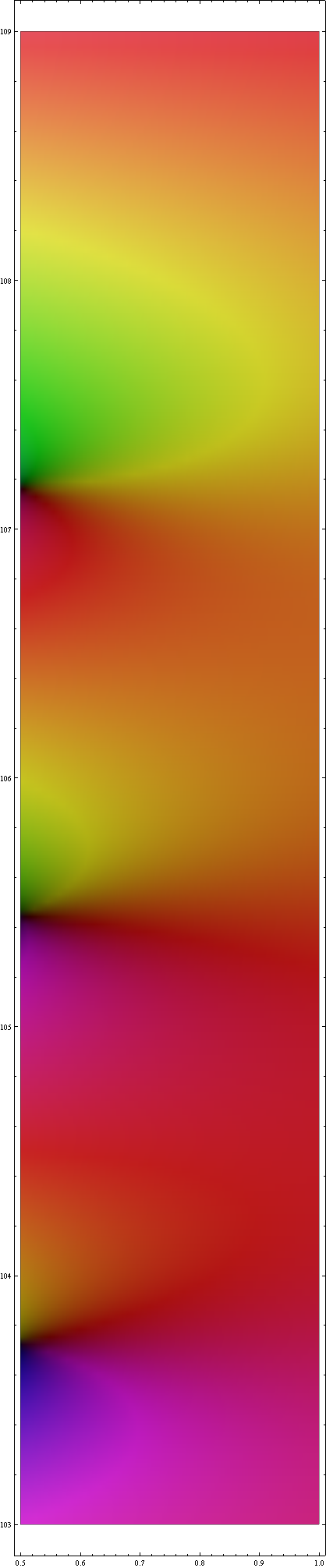
The Riemann zeta function on the strip 1/2 < Re(s) < 1; 103 < Im(s) < 109.

== Formal statement ==
A mathematically precise statement of universality for the Riemann zeta function ζ(s) follows.

Let U be a compact subset of the strip

$$\left\{\ s \in \mathbb{C} : \frac{\ 1\ }{ 2 } < \operatorname\mathrm{Re}(s) < 1\ \right\}$$

such that the complement of U is connected. Let f : U → ℂ be a continuous function on U which is holomorphic on the interior of U and does not have any zeros in U. Then for any ε > 0 there exists a t ≥ 0 such that

| $\Bigl|\ \zeta(s+it) - f(s)\ \Bigr| < \varepsilon$ | 1 |

for all $s \in U.$ Even more: The lower density of the set of values t satisfying the above inequality is positive. More precisely,
$$0 ~ < ~ \liminf_{T \to \infty} ~ \frac{ 1 }{\ T\ }
\ \lambda\!\left( \left\{\ t \in [0,T] \; : \; \max_{s\in U} \Bigl|\ \zeta(s+it) - f(s)\ \Bigr| < \varepsilon\ \right\} \right),$$
where $\lambda$ is the Lebesgue measure on the real numbers and $\liminf$ is the limit inferior.

== Discussion ==
The condition that the complement of U be connected essentially means that U does not contain any holes.

The intuitive meaning of the first statement is as follows: it is possible to move U by some vertical displacement it so that the function f on U is approximated by the zeta function on the displaced copy of U, to an accuracy of ε.

The function f is not allowed to have any zeros on U. This is an important restriction; if we start with a holomorphic function with an isolated zero, then any "nearby" holomorphic function will also have a zero. According to the Riemann hypothesis, the Riemann zeta function does not have any zeros in the considered strip, and so it could not possibly approximate such a function. The function f(s) = 0 which is identically zero on U can be approximated by ζ: we can first pick the "nearby" function g(s) = ε/2 (which is holomorphic and does not have zeros) and find a vertical displacement such that ζ approximates g to accuracy ε/2, and therefore f to accuracy ε.

The accompanying figure shows the zeta function on a representative part of the relevant strip. The color of the point s encodes the value ζ(s) as follows: the hue represents the argument of ζ(s), with red denoting positive real values, and then counterclockwise through yellow, green cyan, blue and purple. Strong colors denote values close to 0 (black = 0), weak colors denote values far away from 0 (white = ∞). The picture shows three zeros of the zeta function, at about 1/2 + 103.7i, 1/2 + 105.5i and 1/2 + 107.2i. Voronin's theorem essentially states that this strip contains all possible "analytic" color patterns that do not use black or white.

The rough meaning of the statement on the lower density is as follows: if a function f and an ε > 0 are given, then there is a positive probability that a randomly picked vertical displacement it will yield an approximation of f to accuracy ε.

The interior of U may be empty, in which case there is no requirement of f being holomorphic. For example, if we take U to be a line segment, then a continuous function f : U → C is a curve in the complex plane, and we see that the zeta function encodes every possible curve (i.e., any figure that can be drawn without lifting the pencil) to arbitrary precision on the considered strip.

The theorem as stated applies only to regions U that are contained in the strip. However, if we allow translations and scalings, we can also find encoded in the zeta functions approximate versions of all non-vanishing holomorphic functions defined on other regions. In particular, since the zeta function itself is holomorphic, versions of itself are encoded within it at different scales, the hallmark of a fractal.

The surprising nature of the theorem may be summarized in this way: the Riemann zeta function contains "all possible behaviors" within it, and is thus "chaotic" in a sense, yet it is a perfectly smooth analytic function with a straightforward definition.

=== Proof sketch ===
A sketch of the proof presented in (Voronin and Karatsuba, 1992) follows. We consider only the case where U is a disk centered at 3/4:

$$U=\{ s\in \mathbb{C} : |s-3/4|<r \}\quad\mbox{with}\quad 0<r<1/4$$

and we will argue that every non-zero holomorphic function defined on U can be approximated by the ζ-function on a vertical translation of this set.

Passing to the logarithm, it is enough to show that for every holomorphic function g : U → C and every ε > 0 there exists a real number t such that

$$\left| \ln \zeta(s+it)-g(s) \right| < \varepsilon \quad \text{for all} \quad s \in U.$$

We will first approximate g(s) with the logarithm of certain finite products reminiscent of the Euler product for the ζ-function:

$$\zeta(s)=\prod_{p\in\mathbb{P}}\left(1-\frac{1}{p^s}\right)^{-1} ,$$

where $\mathbb{P}$ denotes the set of all primes.

If $\theta=(\theta_p)_{p\in\mathbb{P}}$ is a sequence of real numbers, one for each prime p, and M is a finite set of primes, we set

$$\zeta_M(s,\theta)=\prod_{p\in M}\left(1-\frac{e^{-2\pi i \theta_p}}{p^s}\right)^{-1}.$$

We consider the specific sequence

$$\hat\theta=\left(\frac{1}{4},\frac{2}{4},\frac{3}{4},\frac{4}{4},\frac{5}{4},\ldots\right)$$

and claim that g(s) can be approximated by a function of the form $\ln(\zeta_M(s,\hat\theta))$ for a suitable set M of primes. The proof of this claim utilizes the Bergman space, falsely named Hardy space in (Voronin and Karatsuba, 1992), in H of holomorphic functions defined on U, a Hilbert space. We set

$$u_k(s)=\ln\left(1-\frac{e^{-\pi i k/2}}{p_k^s} \right)$$

where p_{k} denotes the k-th prime number. It can then be shown that the series

$$\sum_{k=1}^\infty u_k$$

is conditionally convergent in H; that is, for every element v of H, there exists a rearrangement of the series which converges in H to v. This argument uses a theorem that generalizes the Riemann series theorem to a Hilbert space setting. Because of a relationship between the norm in H and the maximum absolute value of a function, we can then approximate our given function g(s) with an initial segment of this rearranged series, as required.

By a version of the Kronecker theorem, applied to the real numbers $\frac{\ln 2}{2\pi}, \frac{\ln 3}{2\pi}, \frac{\ln 5}{2\pi},\ldots,\frac{\ln p_N}{2\pi}$ (which are linearly independent over the rationals), we can find real values of t so that $\ln(\zeta_M(s,\hat\theta))$ is approximated by $\ln(\zeta_M(s+it,0))$. Further, for some of these values t, $\ln(\zeta_M(s+it,0))$ approximates $\ln(\zeta(s+it))$, finishing the proof.

The theorem is stated without proof in §11.11 of (Titchmarsh and Heath-Brown, 1986), the second edition of a 1951 monograph by Titchmarsh; a weaker result is given in Thm. 11.9. Although Voronin's theorem is not proved there, two corollaries are derived from it:

1. Let $\tfrac12<\sigma<1$ be fixed. Then the curve
  $$\gamma(t) = (\zeta(\sigma+i t),\zeta'(\sigma+i t),\dots,\zeta^{(n-1)}(\sigma+i t))$$
  is dense in $\mathbb{C}^n.$
2. Let $\Phi$ be any continuous function, and let $h_1,h_2,\dots,h_n$ be real constants. Then $\zeta(s)$ cannot satisfy the differential-difference equation
  $$\Phi\{\zeta(s+h_1),\zeta'(s+h_1),\dots,\zeta^{(n_1)}(s+h_1), \zeta(s+h_2),\zeta'(s+h_2),\dots,\zeta^{(n_2)}(s+h_2),\dots \}
= 0$$
  unless $\Phi$ vanishes identically.

== Effective universality ==
Some recent work has focused on effective universality. Under the conditions stated at the beginning of this article, there exist values of t that satisfy inequality (1). An effective universality theorem places an upper bound on the smallest such t.

For example, in 2003, Garunkštis proved that if $f(s)$ is analytic in $|s| \leq .05$ with $\max_{ \left | s \right | \leq .05} \left | f(s) \right | \leq 1$, then for any ε in $0 < \epsilon < 1/2$, there exists a number $t$ in $0 \leq t \leq \exp({ \exp({10/\epsilon^{13} }) })$ such that
$$\max_{\left | s \right | \leq .0001} \left | \log \zeta(s + \frac{3}{4} + i t) - f(s) \right | < \epsilon.$$
For example, if $\epsilon = 1/10$, then the bound for t is $t \leq \exp({ \exp({10/\epsilon^{13} }) }) = \exp({ \exp({10^{14} }) })$.

Bounds can also be obtained on the measure of these t values, in terms of ε:
$$\liminf_{T\to\infty} \frac{1}{T}
\,\lambda\!\left( \left\{
t\in[0,T] :
\max_{\left | s \right | \leq .0001} \left | \log \zeta(s + \frac{3}{4} + i t) - f(s) \right | < \epsilon
\right\} \right)
\geq \frac{1}{\exp( {\epsilon^{-13}} )}.$$
For example, if $\epsilon = 1/10$, then the right-hand side is $1 / \exp( {10^{13}} )$. See.

== Universality of other zeta functions ==
Work has been done showing that universality extends to Selberg zeta functions.

The Dirichlet L-functions show not only universality, but a certain kind of joint universality that allows any set of functions to be approximated by the same value(s) of t in different L-functions, where each function to be approximated is paired with a different L-function.

A similar universality property has been shown for the Lerch zeta function $L(\lambda, \alpha, s)$, at least when the parameter α is a transcendental number. Sections of the Lerch zeta function have also been shown to have a form of joint universality.
