= Proof of the Euler product formula for the Riemann zeta function =

Use of a Dirichlet series expansion to calculate the complex function

Leonhard Euler proved the Euler product formula for the Riemann zeta function in his thesis Variae observationes circa series infinitas (Various Observations about Infinite Series), published by St Petersburg Academy in 1737.

== Euler product formula ==
The Euler product formula for the Riemann zeta function reads

$$\zeta(s) = \sum_{n=1}^\infty\frac{1}{n^s} = \prod_{p \text{ prime}} \frac{1}{1-p^{-s}}$$

where the left hand side equals the Riemann zeta function:

$$\zeta(s) = \sum_{n=1}^\infty\frac{1}{n^s} = 1+\frac{1}{2^s}+\frac{1}{3^s}+\frac{1}{4^s}+\frac{1}{5^s}+ \ldots$$

and the product on the right hand side extends over all prime numbers p:

$$\prod_{p \text{ prime}} \frac{1}{1-p^{-s}} = \frac{1}{1-2^{-s}}\cdot\frac{1}{1-3^{-s}}\cdot\frac{1}{1-5^{-s}}\cdot\frac{1}{1-7^{-s}} \cdots \frac{1}{1-p^{-s}} \cdots$$

Euler product absolutely converges for $\sigma > 1$ and converges on $\sigma = 1, t \neq 0$.

== Proof of the Euler product formula ==
The method of Eratosthenes used to sieve out prime numbers is employed in this proof.

This sketch of a proof makes use of simple algebra only. This was the method by which Euler originally discovered the formula. There is a certain sieving property that we can use to our advantage:

$$\zeta(s) = 1+\frac{1}{2^s}+\frac{1}{3^s}+\frac{1}{4^s}+\frac{1}{5^s}+ \ldots$$
$$\frac{1}{2^s}\zeta(s) = \frac{1}{2^s}+\frac{1}{4^s}+\frac{1}{6^s}+\frac{1}{8^s}+\frac{1}{10^s}+ \ldots$$

Subtracting the second equation from the first, we remove all elements that have a factor of 2:

$$\left(1-\frac{1}{2^s}\right)\zeta(s) = 1+\frac{1}{3^s}+\frac{1}{5^s}+\frac{1}{7^s}+\frac{1}{9^s}+\frac{1}{11^s}+\frac{1}{13^s}+ \ldots$$

Repeating for the next term:

$$\frac{1}{3^s}\left(1-\frac{1}{2^s}\right)\zeta(s) = \frac{1}{3^s}+\frac{1}{9^s}+\frac{1}{15^s}+\frac{1}{21^s}+\frac{1}{27^s}+\frac{1}{33^s}+ \ldots$$

Subtracting again we get:

$$\left(1-\frac{1}{3^s}\right)\left(1-\frac{1}{2^s}\right)\zeta(s) = 1+\frac{1}{5^s}+\frac{1}{7^s}+\frac{1}{11^s}+\frac{1}{13^s}+\frac{1}{17^s}+ \ldots ,$$

where all elements having a factor of 3 or 2 (or both) are removed.

It can be seen that the right side is being sieved. Repeating infinitely for $\frac{1}{p^s}$ where p is prime, we get:

$$\ldots \left(1-\frac{1}{11^s}\right)\left(1-\frac{1}{7^s}\right)\left(1-\frac{1}{5^s}\right)\left(1-\frac{1}{3^s}\right)\left(1-\frac{1}{2^s} \right)\zeta(s) = 1$$

Dividing both sides by everything but the ζ(s), we obtain:

$$\zeta(s) = \frac{1}{\left(1-\frac{1}{2^s}\right)\left(1-\frac{1}{3^s}\right)\left(1-\frac{1}{5^s}\right)\left(1-\frac{1}{7^s}\right)\left(1-\frac{1}{11^s}\right) \ldots }$$

This can be written more concisely as an infinite product over all primes p:

$$\zeta(s) = \prod_{p \text{ prime}} \frac{1}{1-p^{-s}}$$

To make this proof rigorous, we need only to observe that when $\Re(s) > 1$, the sieved right-hand side approaches 1, which follows immediately from the convergence of the Dirichlet series for $\zeta(s)$.

== Case s = 1 ==
An interesting result can be found for ζ(1), the harmonic series

$$\ldots \left(1-\frac{1}{11}\right)\left(1-\frac{1}{7}\right)\left(1-\frac{1}{5}\right)\left(1-\frac{1}{3}\right)\left(1-\frac{1}{2}\right)\zeta(1) = 1$$

which can also be written as,

$$\ldots \left(\frac{10}{11}\right)\left(\frac{6}{7}\right)\left(\frac{4}{5}\right)\left(\frac{2}{3}\right)\left(\frac{1}{2}\right)\zeta(1) = 1$$

which is,

$$\left(\frac{\ldots\cdot10\cdot6\cdot4\cdot2\cdot1}{\ldots\cdot11\cdot7\cdot5\cdot3\cdot2}\right)\zeta(1) = 1$$

as $\zeta(1) = 1+\frac{1}{2}+\frac{1}{3}+\frac{1}{4}+\frac{1}{5}+ \ldots$

Thus,

$$1+\frac{1}{2}+\frac{1}{3}+\frac{1}{4}+\frac{1}{5}+ \ldots = \frac{2\cdot 3\cdot 5\cdot 7\cdot 11\cdot\ldots}{1\cdot 2\cdot 4\cdot 6\cdot 10\cdot\ldots}$$

While the series ratio test is inconclusive for the left-hand side it may be shown divergent by bounding logarithms. Similarly for the right-hand side the infinite coproduct of reals greater than one does not guarantee divergence, e.g.,

$$\lim_{n \to \infty} \left(1+\frac{1}{n}\right)^n = e$$.

Instead, the partial products (whose numerators are primorials) may be bounded, using ln(1 + x) ≤ x, as

$$\prod_{k=1}^n \frac{p_k}{p_k-1}=e^{-\sum_{k=1}^n \ln \left(1-\frac{1}{p_k}\right)}\ge e^{\sum_{k=1}^n \frac{1}{p_k}},$$

so that divergence is clear given the double-logarithmic divergence of the inverse prime series. (Note that Euler's original proof for inverse prime series used just the converse direction to prove the divergence of the inverse prime series based on that of the Euler product and the harmonic series.)

== Another proof ==
Each factor (for a given prime p) in the product above is equal a geometric series with common ratio p^{−s} when this series converges:

$$\frac{1}{1-p^{-s}} = 1 + \frac{1}{p^s} + \frac{1}{p^{2s}} + \frac{1}{p^{3s}} + \ldots$$

When $\Re(s) > 1$, $\vert p^{-s} \vert < 1$, and this series converges absolutely. Hence we may take a finite number of factors, multiply them together, and rearrange terms. Taking all the primes p up to some prime number limit q, we have

$$\left|\zeta(s) - \prod_{p \le q}\left(\frac{1}{1-p^{-s}}\right)\right| < \sum_{n=q+1}^\infty \frac{1}{n^{\sigma}} ,$$

where $\sigma = \Re(s)$. By the fundamental theorem of arithmetic, the partial product when expanded out gives a sum consisting of those terms n^{−s} where n is a product of primes less than or equal to q. The inequality results from the fact that therefore only integers larger than q can fail to appear in this expanded out partial product. Since the difference between the partial product and ζ(s) goes to zero when σ > 1, we have convergence in this region.

== Absolute Convergence of Euler product ==
$$\prod_{p \text{ prime}} \frac{1}{1-p^{-s}}$$

absolutely converges for $\sigma > 1$:

If

$$\prod_{n=1}^{\infty} (1+|s_n|)$$

converges, then

$$\prod_{n=1}^{\infty} (1+s_n)$$

converges.

Let $s_n = - p^{-s}$, and using:

$$\prod_{p \text{ prime}} (1-p^{-s})$$

Prove that

$$e^{\sum_{p \text{ prime}} \frac{1}{p^\sigma}} > \prod_{p \text{ prime}} (1+p^{-\sigma}) > \sum_{p \text{ prime}} \frac{1}{p^\sigma}$$

converges.

The infinite product convergence can be tested via Prime zeta function:

$$\zeta(\sigma) > P(\sigma) = \sum_{p \text{ prime}} \frac{1}{p^\sigma}$$

which converges for $\Re(s) > 1$ by Divergence of the sum of the reciprocals of the primes.

== See also ==
- Euler product
- Riemann zeta function
