= Sinai–Ruelle–Bowen measure =

Invariant measure that displays a less restricted form of ergodicity

In the mathematical discipline of ergodic theory, a Sinai–Ruelle–Bowen (SRB) measure is an invariant measure that behaves similarly to, but is not an ergodic measure. In order to be ergodic, the time average would need to equal the space average for almost all initial states $x \in X$, with $X$ being the phase space. For an SRB measure $\mu$, it suffices that the ergodicity condition be valid for initial states in a set $B(\mu)$ of positive Lebesgue measure.

The initial ideas pertaining to SRB measures were introduced by Yakov Sinai, David Ruelle and Rufus Bowen in the less general area of Anosov diffeomorphisms and axiom A attractors.

== Definition ==
Let $T:X \rightarrow X$ be a map. Then a measure $\mu$ defined on $X$ is an SRB measure if there exist $U \subset X$ of positive Lebesgue measure, and $V \subset U$ with same Lebesgue measure, such that:

$$\lim_{n \rightarrow \infty} \frac{1}{n} \sum_{i = 0}^n \varphi(T^i x) = \int_U \varphi \, d\mu$$

for every $x \in V$ and every continuous function $\varphi: U \rightarrow \mathbb{R}$.

One can see the SRB measure $\mu$ as one that satisfies the conclusions of Birkhoff's ergodic theorem on a smaller set contained in $X$.

== Existence of SRB measures ==
The following theorem establishes sufficient conditions for the existence of SRB measures. It considers the case of Axiom A attractors, which is simpler, but it has been extended times to more general scenarios.

Theorem 1: Let $T: X \rightarrow X$ be a $C^2$ diffeomorphism with an Axiom A attractor $\mathcal{A} \subset X$. Assume that this attractor is irreducible, that is, it is not the union of two other sets that are also invariant under $T$. Then there is a unique Borelian measure $\mu$, with $\mu(X) = 1$, (Note: If it does not integrate to one, there will be infinite such measures, each being equal to the other except for a multiplicative constant.) characterized by the following equivalent statements:

1. $\mu$ is an SRB measure;
2. $\mu$ has absolutely continuous measures conditioned on the unstable manifold and submanifolds thereof;
3. $h(T) = \int \log {\bigl| \det(D T)|_{E^u} \bigr|} \, d\mu$, where $h$ is the Kolmogorov–Sinai entropy, $E^u$ is the unstable manifold and $D$ is the differential operator.

Also, in these conditions $\left(T, X, \mathcal{B}(X), \mu \right)$ is a measure-preserving dynamical system.

It has also been proved that the above are equivalent to stating that $\mu$ equals the zero-noise limit stationary distribution of a Markov chain with states $T^i(x)$. That is, consider that to each point $x \in X$ is associated a transition probability $P_\varepsilon(\cdot \mid x)$ with noise level $\varepsilon$ that measures the amount of uncertainty of the next state, in a way such that:

$$\lim_{\varepsilon \rightarrow 0} P_{\varepsilon}(\cdot \mid x) = \delta_{Tx}(\cdot),$$

where $\delta$ is the Dirac measure. The zero-noise limit is the stationary distribution of this Markov chain when the noise level approaches zero. The importance of this is that it states mathematically that the SRB measure is a "good" approximation to practical cases where small amounts of noise exist, though nothing can be said about the amount of noise that is tolerable.

== See also ==
- Quasi-invariant measure
- Krylov–Bogolyubov theorem
- Gibbs measure
