= Lothar Göttsche =

German mathematician (born 1961)

Lothar Göttsche (born January 21, 1961, in Sonderburg, Denmark) is a German mathematician, known for his work in algebraic geometry.

He is a research scientist at the International Centre for Theoretical Physics in Trieste, Italy. He is also editor for Geometry & Topology.

== Biography ==
After studying mathematics at the University of Kiel, he received his Dr. rer. nat. under the direction of Friedrich Hirzebruch at the University of Bonn in 1989.

Göttsche was invited as speaker to the International Congress of Mathematicians in Beijing in 2002. In 2012 he became a fellow of the American Mathematical Society.

== Work ==
Göttsche received international acclaim with his formula for the generating function for the Betti numbers of the Hilbert scheme of points on an algebraic surface:

If $S$ is a smooth surface over an algebraically closed field of characteristic $0$, then the generating function for the motives of the Hilbert schemes of $S$ can be expressed in terms of the motivic zeta function by Göttsche's formula

$$\sum_{n=0}^\infty[S^{[n]}]t^n=\prod_{m=1}^\infty Z(S,{\mathbb L}^{m-1}t^m)$$

Here $S^{[n]}$ is the Hilbert scheme of length $n$ subschemes of $S$.

Göttsche is also the author of a celebrated conjecture predicting the number of curves in certain linear systems on algebraic surfaces.
