= Shintani's unit theorem =

On subgroups of finite index of the totally positive units of a number field

In mathematics, Shintani's unit theorem introduced by Shintani (1976, proposition 4) is a refinement of Dirichlet's unit theorem and states that a subgroup of finite index of the totally positive units of a number field has a fundamental domain given by a rational polyhedric cone in the Minkowski space of the field (Neukirch 1999, p. 507).
