= Barnes zeta function =

In mathematics, a Barnes zeta function is a generalization of the Riemann zeta function introduced by E. W. Barnes (1901). It is further generalized by the Shintani zeta function.

== Definition ==
The Barnes zeta function is defined by

$$\zeta_N(s,w\mid a_1,\ldots,a_N)=\sum_{n_1,\dots,n_N\ge 0}\frac{1}{(w+n_1a_1+\cdots+n_Na_N)^s}$$

where w and a_{j} have positive real part and s has real part greater than N.

It has a meromorphic continuation to all complex s, whose only singularities are simple poles at s = 1, 2, ..., N. For N = w = a_{1} = 1 it is the Riemann zeta function.
