= David Ruelle =

Belgian-French mathematical physicist

David P. Ruelle
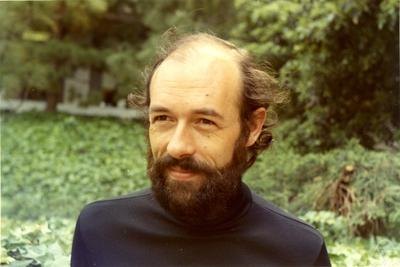
- David Ruelle (1973)
- Born: 20 August 1935 (age 91); Ghent, Belgium
- Education: Free University of Brussels
- Known for: Dobrushin–Lanford–Ruelle equations; Haag–Ruelle scattering theory; Ruelle zeta function; Sinai–Ruelle–Bowen measure
- Awards: Dannie Heineman Prize for Mathematical Physics (1985); Boltzmann Medal (1986); Holweck Prize (1993); Matteucci Medal (2004); Henri Poincaré Prize (2006); Max Planck Medal (2014); Dirac Medal (2022)
- Scientific career
- Fields: Mathematical physics
- Workplaces: ETH Zurich; Institute for Advanced Study; Institut des Hautes Études Scientifiques; Rutgers University
- Doctoral students: Giovanni Gallavotti

David Pierre Ruelle (French: [david pjɛʁ ʁɥɛl]; born 20 August 1935) is a Belgian and naturalized French mathematical physicist. He has worked on statistical physics and dynamical systems. With Floris Takens, Ruelle coined the term strange attractor, and developed a new theory of turbulence.

== Biography ==
Ruelle studied physics at the Free University of Brussels, obtaining a PhD degree in 1959 under the supervision of Res Jost. He spent two years (1960–1962) at the ETH Zurich, and another two years (1962–1964) at the Institute for Advanced Study in Princeton, New Jersey. In 1964, he became professor at the Institut des Hautes Études Scientifiques in Bures-sur-Yvette, France. Since 2000, he has been an emeritus professor at IHES and distinguished visiting professor at Rutgers University.

David Ruelle made fundamental contributions in various aspects of mathematical physics. In quantum field theory, the most important contribution is the rigorous formulation of scattering processes based on Wightman's axiomatic theory. This approach is known as the Haag–Ruelle scattering theory. Later Ruelle helped to create a rigorous theory of statistical mechanics of equilibrium, that includes the study of the thermodynamic limit, the equivalence of ensembles, and the convergence of Mayer's series. A further result is the Asano-Ruelle lemma, which allows the study of the zeros of certain polynomial functions that are recurrent in statistical mechanics.

The study of infinite systems led to the local definition of Gibbs states or to the global definition of equilibrium states. Ruelle demonstrated with Roland L. Dobrushin and Oscar E. Lanford that translationally invariant Gibbs states are precisely the equilibrium states.

Together with Floris Takens, he proposed the description of hydrodynamic turbulence based on strange attractors with chaotic properties of hyperbolic dynamics.

== Honors and awards ==
Since 1985 David Ruelle has been a member of the French Academy of Sciences and in 1988 he was Josiah Willard Gibbs Lecturer in Atlanta, Georgia. Since 1992 he has been an international honorary member of the American Academy of Arts and Sciences and since 1993 ordinary member of the Academia Europaea. Since 2002 he has been an international member of the United States National Academy of Sciences and since 2003 a foreign member of the Accademia Nazionale dei Lincei. Since 2012 he has been a fellow of the American Mathematical Society.

In 1985 David Ruelle was awarded the Dannie Heineman Prize for Mathematical Physics and in 1986 he received the Boltzmann Medal for his outstanding contributions to statistical mechanics. In 1993 he won the Holweck Prize and in 2004 he received the Matteucci Medal. In 2006 he was awarded the Henri Poincaré Prize and in 2014 he was honored with the prestigious Max Planck Medal for his achievements in theoretical physics. In 2022, Ruelle was awarded the ICTP's Dirac Medal for Mathematical Physics, along with Elliott H. Lieb and Joel Lebowitz, "for groundbreaking and mathematically rigorous contributions to the understanding of the statistical mechanics of classical and quantum physical systems".

== Selected publications ==
- Ruelle, David (1993). Chance and chaos. Vol. 110. Princeton University Press. ISBN 978-0691021003; pbk ISBN 978-0691085746; hbk
- Ruelle, David (1999). Statistical mechanics: Rigorous results. World Scientific. ISBN 978-9810238629. 1st edition 1969
- Ruelle, David (2004). Thermodynamic formalism: the mathematical structure of equilibrium statistical mechanics. Cambridge University Press. ISBN 978-0521546492. 1st edition 1978
- Ruelle, David (2004). Dynamical zeta functions for piecewise monotone maps of the interval. American Mathematical Society. ISBN 978-0821836019.
- Ruelle, David (1995). Turbulence, strange attractors and chaos. World Scientific. ISBN 978-9810223113.
- Ruelle, David (2008). Chaotic evolution and strange attractors. Vol. 1. Cambridge University Press. ISBN 978-0521368308. 1989 edition
- Ruelle, David (2014). Elements of differentiable dynamics and bifurcation theory. Elsevier. ISBN 978-1483245881. 1989 1st edition
- Ruelle, David; Takens, Floris (1971). "On the nature of turbulence". Les rencontres physiciens-mathématiciens de Strasbourg. 12: 1–44.
- Ruelle, David (1995). "Turbulence, Strange Attractors, and Chaos". World Scientific. 16: 195. Bibcode:1995tsac.book.....R.
- Eckmann, Jean-Pierre; Ruelle, David (1985). "Ergodic theory of chaos and strange attractors". Reviews of Modern Physics. 57 (3): 617–656. Bibcode:1985RvMP...57..617E. doi:10.1103/RevModPhys.57.617.
- Ruelle, David (1962). "On the asymptotic condition in quantum field theory". Helvetica Physica Acta. 35: 147–163. doi:10.5169/seals-113272.
- Ruelle, David (2007). The mathematician's brain. Princeton University Press. ISBN 978-0691129822.
- Ruelle, David (2011). L'Étrange Beauté des mathématiques (in French). Odile Jacob. ISBN 978-2738126245.

== See also ==
- Axiomatic quantum field theory
- Chaos theory
- Dynamical systems theory
- Dobrushin–Lanford–Ruelle equations
- Fluid mechanics
- Haag–Ruelle scattering theory
- Ruelle zeta-function
- Sinai–Ruelle–Bowen measure
- Statistical physics
- Strange attractor
- Transfer operator
