= Kohji Matsumoto =

Japanese mathematician

- 松本 耕二
- Education: Rikkyo University
- Occupation: Mathematician
- Years active: 1982–present
- Employer: Nagoya University
- Known for: Discovering the Matsumoto zeta function
- Website: https://www.math.nagoya-u.ac.jp/~kohjimat/

Kohji Matsumoto (松本 耕二, Matsumoto Kōji) is a Japanese mathematician. He is professor of mathematics at Nagoya University in Nagoya, Japan.

== Education and career ==
Matsumoto graduated from the University of Tokyo in 1981. He got a doctoral degree from Rikkyo University in 1986, advised by Akio Fujii. His thesis was titled Discrepancy estimates for the value-distribution of the Riemann zeta-function. He became a lecturer at Iwate University in 1987 and an associate professor there in 1990. He joined Nagoya University in 1995, becoming a full professor there in 2001.

=== Research ===
Matsumoto's specializations include number theory, zeta theory, and mathematical analysis. He is mostly recognized for the Matsumoto zeta function, a zeta function named after him. He co-edited Analytic Number Theory (2002), a book about prime numbers, divisor problems, Diophantine equations, and other topics related to analytic number theory, including Diophantine approximations, and the theory of zeta and L-functions. His other book, Algebraic And Analytic Aspects Of Zeta Functions And L-Functions, a compilation of lectures at the French-Japanese Winter School, was published in 2010.

== Selected publications ==
- Yasushi Komori; Kohji Matsumoto; Hirofumi Tsumura (2011). "Shuffle products for multiple zeta values and partial fraction decompositions of zeta-functions of root systems". Mathematische Zeitschrift. 268 (3): 993–1011. arXiv:0908.0670. doi:10.1007/s00209-010-0705-6. S2CID 13650547.
- Yasutaka Ihara; Kohji Matsumoto (2010). "On Certain Mean Values And The Value-Distribution Of Logarithms Of Dirichlet L-Functions". Quarterly Journal of Mathematics. 61 (3): 637–677. doi:10.1093/qmath/haq002.
- Kohji Matsumoto; Hirofumi Tsumura (2006). "On Witten multiple zeta-functions associated with semisimple Lie algebras I". Annales de l'Institut Fourier. 56 (5): 1457–1504. doi:10.5802/aif.2218. hdl:2237/20336.
- Kohji Matsumoto (2005). "Liftings and mean value theorems for automorphic L-functions". Proceedings of the London Mathematical Society. 90 (2): 297–320. doi:10.1112/S0024611504015096. hdl:2237/10258. S2CID 37655558.
- Kohji Matsumoto (2003). "The analytic continuation and the asymptotic behaviour of certain multiple zeta-functions I". Journal of Number Theory. 101 (2): 223–243. doi:10.1016/S0022-314X(03)00041-6.
- Kohji Matsumoto (2003). "Asymptotic expansions of double zeta-functions of Barnes, of Shintani, and Eisenstein series". Nagoya Mathematical Journal. 172 (2003): 59–102. doi:10.1017/S0027763000008643.
- Shigeki Egami; Kohji Matsumoto (2002). "Asymptotic Expansions Of Multiple Zeta Functions And Power Mean Values Of Hurwitz Zeta Functions". Journal of the London Mathematical Society. 66 (1): 41–60. doi:10.1112/S0024610702003253. hdl:2237/10284. S2CID 122788995.
- Masanori Katsurada; Kohji Matsumoto (2002). "Explicit Formulas and Asymptotic Expansions for Certain Mean Square of Hurwitz Zeta-Functions: III". Compositio Mathematica. 131 (3): 239–266. doi:10.1023/A:1015585314625. hdl:2237/10253.
- Kohji Matsumoto (2002). "Corrigendum and addendum to 'asymptotic series for double zeta, double gamma and Hecke L-functions'". Mathematical Proceedings of the Cambridge Philosophical Society. 132 (2): 377–384. Bibcode:2002MPCPS.132..377M. doi:10.1017/S0305004101005631. hdl:2237/10256. S2CID 122651721.
- Antanas Laurincikas; Kohji Matsumoto (2001). "The universality of zeta-functions attached to certain cusp forms". Acta Arithmetica. 98 (4): 345–359. Bibcode:2001AcAri..98..345L. doi:10.4064/aa98-4-2.
- Antanas Laurinčikas; Kohji Matsumoto (2000). "The joint universality and the functional independence for Lerch zeta-functions". Nagoya Mathematical Journal. 157 (2000): 211–227. doi:10.1017/S002776300000725X.
- Matsumoto, Kohji (1990). "Value-distribution of zeta-functions". In Nagasaka, Kenji; Fouvry, Etienne (eds.). Analytic Number Theory: Proceedings of the Japanese-French Symposium held in Tokyo, Japan, October 10-13, 1988. Lecture Notes in Mathematics. Vol. 1434. Springer. pp. 178–187. doi:10.1007/BFb0097134. ISBN 978-3-540-52787-9.
