= Ruelle zeta function =

In mathematics, the Ruelle zeta function is a zeta function associated with a dynamical system. It is named after mathematical physicist David Ruelle.

== Formal definition ==
Let f be a function defined on a manifold M, such that the set of fixed points Fix(f^{n}) is finite for all n > 1. Further let φ be a function on M with values in d × d complex matrices. The zeta function of the first kind is

$$\zeta(z) = \exp\left(
\sum_{m\ge1} \frac{z^m}{m} \sum_{x\in\operatorname{Fix}(f^m)}
\operatorname{Tr}
\left( \prod_{k=0}^{m-1} \varphi(f^k(x))
\right)
\right)$$

== Examples ==
In the special case d = 1, φ = 1, we have

$$\zeta(z) = \exp\left( \sum_{m\ge1} \frac{z^m} m \left|\operatorname{Fix}(f^m)\right| \right)$$

which is the Artin–Mazur zeta function.

The Ihara zeta function is an example of a Ruelle zeta function.

== See also ==
- List of zeta functions
