= Takuro Shintani =

Japanese mathematician

Takuro Shintani (新谷 卓郎, Shintani Takurō; 4 February 1943 – 14 November 1980) was a Japanese mathematician working in number theory who introduced Shintani zeta functions and Shintani's unit theorem. Shintani died by suicide at the age of 37.
