= Matsumoto zeta function =

In mathematics, a Matsumoto zeta function is a type of zeta function introduced by Kohji Matsumoto. The function is defined as

$$\varphi(s)=\prod_{n}^\infty\frac{1}{A_n(p_n^{-s})},$$

where $p_n$ is the $n$-th prime number and $A_n$ is a polynomial.
