= Shintani zeta function =

In mathematics, a Shintani zeta function or Shintani L-function is a generalization of the Riemann zeta function. They were first studied by Takuro Shintani (1976). They include Hurwitz zeta functions and Barnes zeta functions.

== Definition ==
Let $P(\mathbf{x})$ be a polynomial in the variables $\mathbf{x}=(x_1,\dots,x_r)$ with real coefficients such that $P(\mathbf{x})$ is a product of linear polynomials with positive coefficients, that is, $P(\mathbf{x})=P_1(\mathbf{x})P_2(\mathbf{x})\cdots P_k(\mathbf{x})$, where $P_i(\mathbf{x})= a_{i1} x_1 + a_{i2} x_2 +\cdots + a_{ir}x_r + b_i,$where $a_{ij}>0$, $b_i>0$ and $k=\deg P$. The Shintani zeta function in the variable $s$ is given by (the meromorphic continuation of)$\zeta(P;s)=\sum_{x_1,\dots,x_r=1}^{\infty}\frac{1}{P(\mathbf{x})^s}.$

== The multi-variable version ==
The definition of Shintani zeta function has a straightforward generalization to a zeta function in several variables $(s_1,\dots,s_k)$ given by$\sum_{x_1,\dots,x_r=1}^{\infty}\frac{1}{P_1(\mathbf{x})^{s_1}\cdots P_k(\mathbf{x})^{s_k}}.$The special case when k = 1 is the Barnes zeta function.

== Relation to Witten zeta functions ==
Just like Shintani zeta functions, Witten zeta functions are defined by polynomials which are products of linear forms with non-negative coefficients. Witten zeta functions are however not special cases of Shintani zeta functions because in Witten zeta functions the linear forms are allowed to have some coefficients equal to zero. For example, the polynomial $(x+1)(y+1)(x+y+2)/2$ defines the Witten zeta function of $SU(3)$ but the linear form $x+1$ has $y$-coefficient equal to zero.
