= Milnor–Thurston kneading theory =

Mathematical theory in topological dynamics

The Milnor–Thurston kneading theory is a mathematical theory which analyzes the iterates of piecewise monotone mappings of an interval into itself. The emphasis is on understanding the properties of the mapping that are invariant under topological conjugacy.

The theory had been developed by John Milnor and William Thurston in two widely circulated and influential Princeton preprints from 1977 that were revised in 1981 and finally published in 1988. Applications of the theory include piecewise linear models, counting of fixed points, computing the total variation, and constructing an invariant measure with maximal entropy.

== Short description ==
Kneading theory provides an effective calculus for describing the qualitative behavior of the iterates of a piecewise monotone mapping f of a closed interval I of the real line into itself. Some quantitative invariants of this discrete dynamical system, such as the lap numbers of the iterates and the Artin–Mazur zeta function of f are expressed in terms of certain matrices and formal power series.

The basic invariant of f is its kneading matrix, a rectangular matrix with coefficients in the ring $\Z[[t]]$ of integer formal power series. A closely related kneading determinant is a formal power series

$$D(t) = 1 + D_1 t + D_2 t^2 + \cdots\,$$

with odd integer coefficients. In the simplest case when the map is unimodal, with a maximum at c, each coefficient $D_k$ is either $+1$ or $-1$, according to whether the $(k+1)$th iterate $f^{k+1}$ has local maximum or local minimum at c.

== See also ==
- Sharkovsky theorem
- Topological entropy
