= Sergei Mikhailovitch Voronin =

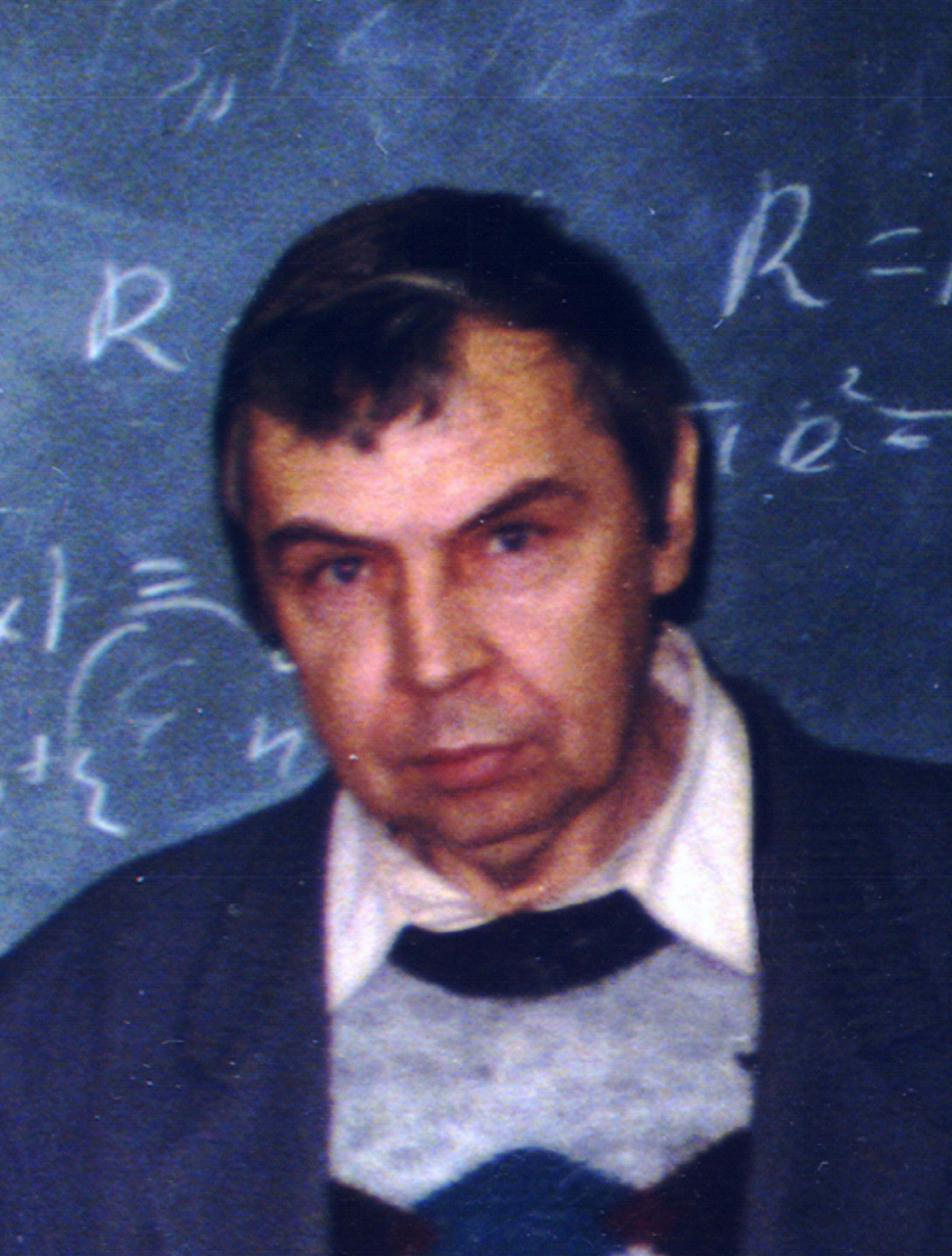
- Born: March 11, 1946; Gorno-Altaisk
- Died: October 18, 1997 (aged 51); Moscow
- Education: Lomonosov University
- Occupation: Mathematician
- Known for: Voronin's universality theorem

Sergei Mikhailovitch Voronin (Russian: Сергей Михайлович Воронин; March 11, 1946 – October 18, 1997) was a Russian mathematician who specialized in number theory. He is known for a theorem showing that the critical strip of the Riemann zeta function has the property of universality.

He also did work in additive number theory and applications of number theory to numerical analysis. He was also interested in the history of mathematics.

== Early life and education ==
Voronin's father was a petroleum engineer and his mother a teacher. He grew up in Buguruslan in the Orenburg region. He studied piano at a music school, successfully participated in mathematics competitions as a student and attended mathematics summer schools in Moscow. In 1963 he transferred to a special boarding school for mathematics in Moscow. In 1964 he entered Lomonosov University, where he studied analytic number theory under Anatoly Karatsuba. In 1972, he received his PhD with the dissertation The Study of the Behavior of the Riemann Zeta Function under advisor Advisor Yulij Ilyashenko.

During the 1990s Voronin was a professor of number theory at the Moscow State Pedagogical University.

== Career ==
In his dissertation, Voronin proved that the Riemann zeta function does not obey a continuous differential equation. In 1975, as part of his habilitation thesis, he proved his universality theorem that any continuous non-vanishing analytic function in a circular disc can be approximated by the Riemann zeta function within the critical strip $\tfrac {1}{2}< \mathrm{Re} \, s < 1$.

The theorem shows the chaotic behavior of the Riemann zeta function in the critical strip. He also dealt with the distribution of zeros of other zeta functions (Dirichlet, Epstein). For example, in 1980 he showed that certain functions (in this case the Davenport-Heilbronn function, soon followed by some Epstein zeta functions) that are defined in the right half-plane by a Dirichlet series and satisfy a functional equation like the Riemann zeta function, but for which the Riemann hypothesis does not hold, nevertheless have an abnormal accumulation of zeros on the critical line.

== Voronin's universality theorem ==
Let $f$ be a continuous function that has no zeros and is analytic inside the circular disc $D(r)$ with $0 <r < \tfrac {1}{4}$. Then, for every real number $\epsilon > 0$, there exists a real number $\tau > 0$ such that, for $| s | \leq r$

$$| \zeta (s + \tfrac {3}{4} + i \tau) - f (s) | < \epsilon$$.

The theorem also holds for general Dirichlet L-functions. The theorem can also be formulated such that continuous, non-vanishing and analytic functions $f$ in circular disks $D$, which lie in the strip $\tfrac{1}{2} < \mathrm{Re} \, s < 1$, can be approximated uniformly with arbitrary precision in $D$ by translations of the Riemann zeta function along the imaginary axis $\zeta (s + i \tau)$. For example, Bhaskar Bagchi generalized it from circular disks to domains $D$ that are simply connected and compact and lie in the strip $\tfrac{1}{2} < \mathrm{Re} \, s < 1$.

The Riemann hypothesis is equivalent to the theorem that the Riemann zeta function itself can also be approximated uniformly in the sense of Voronin's universality theorem.

== Selected publications ==
- Voronin S. M., “The Darboux–Whitney Theorem and Related Questions”, Nonlinear Stokes Phenomenon, Adv. in Sov. Math., 14, ed. Yu. Ilyashenko, Providence, 1993, 139–233 mathscinet zmath
- Elizarov P., Ilyashenko Yu., Shcerbakov A., Voronin S., “Finitely generated groups of germs of one-dimensional conformal mappings, and invariants for complex singular points of analytic foliations of the complex plane”, Nonlinear Stokes Phenomenon, Adv. in Sov. Math., 14, ред. Yu. Ilyashenko, Providence, 1993, 57–105 mathscinet zmath
- Voronin S. M., Grinchii A. A. \pper Analytic classification of saddle resonant singular points of holomorphic vector fields on complex plane, J. of Dynamical and Control Systems, 2:1 (1996), 21–53 crossref mathscinet zmath
- Voronin S. M., “Orbitalnaya analiticheskaya ekvivalentnost vyrozhdennykh osobykh tochek golomorfnykh vektornykh polei na kompleksnoi ploskosti”, Differentsialnye uravneniya s veschestvennym i kompleksnym vremenem, Trudy Matematicheskogo instituta im. V. A. Steklova, 213, 1997, 35–55 mathscinet zmath
- A. A. Karatsuba, S. M. Voronin "The Riemann Zetafunction", De Gruyter 1992, ISBN 978-3-11-013170-3
