= Multiple zeta function =

Generalizations of the Riemann zeta function

In mathematics, the multiple zeta functions are generalizations of the Riemann zeta function, defined by

$$\zeta(s_1,\ldots,s_k) = \sum_{n_1 > n_2 > \cdots > n_k > 0}\ \frac{1}{n_1^{s_1} \cdots n_k^{s_k}} = \sum_{n_1 > n_2 > \cdots > n_k > 0}\ \prod_{i=1}^k \frac{1}{n_i^{s_i}},\!$$

and converge when Re(s_{1}) + ... + Re(s_{i}) > i for all i. Like the Riemann zeta function, the multiple zeta functions can be analytically continued to be meromorphic functions (see, for example, Zhao (1999)). When s_{1}, ..., s_{k} are all positive integers (with s_{1} > 1) these sums are often called multiple zeta values (MZVs) or Euler sums. These values can also be regarded as special values of the multiple polylogarithms.

The k in the above definition is named the "depth" of a MZV, and the n = s_{1} + ... + s_{k} is known as the "weight".

The standard shorthand for writing multiple zeta functions is to place repeating strings of the argument within braces and use a superscript to indicate the number of repetitions. For example,

$$\zeta(2,1,2,1,3) = \zeta(\{2,1\}^2,3).$$

== Definition ==
Multiple zeta functions arise as special cases of the multiple polylogarithms

$$\mathrm{Li}_{s_1,\ldots,s_d}(\mu_1,\ldots,\mu_d) = \sum\limits_{k_1>\cdots>k_d>0}\frac{\mu_1^{k_1}\cdots\mu_d^{k_d}}{k_1^{s_1}\cdots k_d^{s_d}}$$

which are generalizations of the polylogarithm functions. When all of the $\mu_i$ are n^{th} roots of unity and the $s_i$ are all nonnegative integers, the values of the multiple polylogarithm are called colored multiple zeta values of level $n$. In particular, when $n=2$, they are called Euler sums or alternating multiple zeta values, and when $n=1$ they are simply called multiple zeta values. Multiple zeta values are often written

$$\zeta(s_1,\ldots,s_d) = \sum\limits_{k_1 > \cdots > k_d > 0} \frac{1}{k_1^{s_1}\cdots k_d^{s_d}}$$

and Euler sums are written

$$\zeta(s_1,\ldots,s_d;\varepsilon_1,\ldots,\varepsilon_d) = \sum\limits_{k_1 > \cdots > k_d > 0} \frac{\varepsilon_1^{k_1}\cdots \varepsilon_d^{k_d}}{k_1^{s_1}\cdots k_d^{s_d}}$$

where $\varepsilon_i = \pm 1$. Sometimes, authors will write a bar over an $s_i$ corresponding to an $\varepsilon_i$ equal to $-1$, so for example

$$\zeta(\overline{a},b) = \zeta(a,b;-1,1)$$.

== Integral structure and identities ==
It was noticed by Kontsevich that it is possible to express colored multiple zeta values (and thus their special cases) as certain multivariable integrals. This result is often stated with the use of a convention for iterated integrals, wherein

$$\int_0^x f_1(t) dt \cdots f_d(t) dt = \int_0^x f_1(t_1)\left(\int_0^{t_1}f_2(t_2)\left(\int_0^{t_2} \cdots \left( \int_0^{t_d} f_d(t_d) dt_d\right)\right)dt_2\right)dt_1$$

Using this convention, the result can be stated as follows:

$\mathrm{Li}_{s_1,\ldots,s_d}(\mu_1,\ldots,\mu_d) = \int_0^1 \left(\frac{dt}{t}\right)^{s_1-1}\frac{dt}{a_1-t}\cdots \left(\frac{dt}{t}\right)^{s_d-1} \frac{dt}{a_d-t}$ where $a_j = \prod\limits_{i=1}^j \mu_i^{-1}$ for $j = 1,2,\ldots,d$.

This result is extremely useful due to a well-known result regarding products of iterated integrals, namely that

$\left(\int_0^x f_1(t)dt \cdots f_n(t) dt \right)\!\left(\int_0^x f_{n+1}(t)dt\cdots f_m(t) dt \right) = \sum\limits_{\sigma \in \mathfrak{Sh}_{n,m}}\int_0^x f_{\sigma(1)}(t)\cdots f_{\sigma(m)}(t)$ where $\mathfrak{Sh}_{n,m}=\{\sigma \in S_m \mid \sigma(1)<\cdots<\sigma(n), \sigma(n+1)<\cdots<\sigma(m)\}$ and $S_m$ is the symmetric group on $m$ symbols.

To utilize this in the context of multiple zeta values, define $X = \{a,b\}$, $X^*$ to be the free monoid generated by $X$ and $\mathfrak{A}$ to be the free $\Q$-vector space generated by $X^*$. $\mathfrak{A}$ can be equipped with the shuffle product, turning it into an algebra. Then, the multiple zeta function can be viewed as an evaluation map, where we identify $a = \frac{dt}{t}$, $b = \frac{dt}{1-t}$, and define

$\zeta(\mathbf{w}) = \int_0^1 \mathbf{w}$ for any $\mathbf{w} \in X^*$,

which, by the aforementioned integral identity, makes

$$\zeta(a^{s_1-1}b\cdots a^{s_d-1}b) = \zeta(s_1,\ldots,s_d).$$

Then, the integral identity on products gives

$$\zeta(w)\zeta(v) = \zeta(w \text{ ⧢ } v).$$

== Two parameters case ==
In the particular case of only two parameters we have (with s > 1 and n, m integers):

$$\zeta(s,t) = \sum_{n > m \geq 1} \ \frac{1}{n^{s} m^{t}} = \sum_{n=2}^{\infty} \frac{1}{n^{s}} \sum_{m=1}^{n-1} \frac{1}{m^t} = \sum_{n=1}^{\infty} \frac{1}{(n+1)^{s}} \sum_{m=1}^{n} \frac{1}{m^t}$$

$\zeta(s,t) = \sum_{n=1}^\infty \frac{H_{n,t}}{(n+1)^s}$ where $H_{n,t}$ are the generalized harmonic numbers.

Multiple zeta functions are known to satisfy what is known as MZV duality, the simplest case of which is the famous identity of Euler:

$$\sum_{n=1}^\infty \frac{H_n}{(n+1)^2} = \zeta(2,1) = \zeta(3) = \sum_{n=1}^\infty \frac{1}{n^3},\!$$

where H_{n} are the harmonic numbers.

Special values of double zeta functions, with s > 0 and even, t > 1 and odd, but s+t = 2N+1 (taking if necessary ζ(0) = 0):

$$\zeta(s,t) = \zeta(s)\zeta(t) + \tfrac{1}{2}\Big[\tbinom{s+t}{s}-1\Big]\zeta(s+t) - \sum_{r=1}^{N-1}\Big[\tbinom{2r}{s-1}+\tbinom{2r}{t-1}\Big]\zeta(2r+1)\zeta(s+t-1-2r)$$

s	t	approximate value	explicit formulae	OEIS
2	2	0.811742425283353643637002772406	$\tfrac{3}{4}\zeta(4)$	A197110
3	2	0.228810397603353759768746148942	$3\zeta(2)\zeta(3)-\tfrac{11}{2}\zeta(5)$	A258983
4	2	0.088483382454368714294327839086	$\left (\zeta(3)\right )^2-\tfrac{4}{3}\zeta(6)$	A258984
5	2	0.038575124342753255505925464373	$5\zeta(2)\zeta(5)+2\zeta(3)\zeta(4)-11\zeta(7)$	A258985
6	2	0.017819740416835988362659530248		A258947
2	3	0.711566197550572432096973806086	$\tfrac{9}{2}\zeta(5)-2\zeta(2)\zeta(3)$	A258986
3	3	0.213798868224592547099583574508	$\tfrac{1}{2}\left (\left (\zeta(3)\right )^2 -\zeta(6)\right )$	A258987
4	3	0.085159822534833651406806018872	$17\zeta(7)-10\zeta(2)\zeta(5)$	A258988
5	3	0.037707672984847544011304782294	$5\zeta(3)\zeta(5)-\tfrac{147}{24}\zeta(8)-\tfrac{5}{2}\zeta(6,2)$	A258982
2	4	0.674523914033968140491560608257	$\tfrac{25}{12}\zeta(6)-\left (\zeta(3)\right )^2$	A258989
3	4	0.207505014615732095907807605495	$10\zeta(2)\zeta(5)+\zeta(3)\zeta(4)-18\zeta(7)$	A258990
4	4	0.083673113016495361614890436542	$\tfrac{1}{2}\left (\left (\zeta(4)\right )^2 -\zeta(8)\right )$	A258991

Note that if $s+t=2p+2$ we have $p/3$ irreducibles, i.e. these MZVs cannot be written as function of $\zeta(a)$ only.

== Three parameters case ==
In the particular case of only three parameters we have (with a > 1 and n, j, i integers):

$$\zeta(a,b,c) = \sum_{n > j > i \geq 1}\ \frac{1}{n^{a} j^{b} i^{c}} = \sum_{n=1}^{\infty} \frac{1}{(n+2)^{a}} \sum_{j=1}^n \frac{1}{(j+1)^b} \sum_{i=1}^{j} \frac{1}{(i)^c} = \sum_{n=1}^{\infty} \frac{1}{(n+2)^{a}} \sum_{j=1}^n \frac{H_{j,c}}{(j+1)^b}$$

== Euler reflection formula ==
The above MZVs satisfy the Euler reflection formula:

$\zeta(a,b)+\zeta(b,a)=\zeta(a)\zeta(b)-\zeta(a+b)$ for $a,b>1$

Using the shuffle relations, it is easy to prove that:

$\zeta(a,b,c)+\zeta(a,c,b)+\zeta(b,a,c)+\zeta(b,c,a)+\zeta(c,a,b)+\zeta(c,b,a)=\zeta(a)\zeta(b)\zeta(c)+2\zeta(a+b+c)-\zeta(a)\zeta(b+c)-\zeta(b)\zeta(a+c)-\zeta(c)\zeta(a+b)$ for $a,b,c>1$

This function can be seen as a generalization of the reflection formulas.

== Symmetric sums in terms of the zeta function ==
Let $S(i_1,i_2,\cdots,i_k) = \sum_{n_1 \geq n_2 \geq\cdots n_k \geq 1}\frac{1}{n_1^{i_1} n_2^{i_2}\cdots n_k^{i_k}}$, and for a partition $\Pi=\{P_1, P_2, \dots,P_l\}$ of the set $\{1,2,\dots,k\}$, let $c(\Pi) = (\left|P_1\right|-1)!(\left|P_2\right|-1)!\cdots(\left|P_l\right|-1)!$. Also, given such a $\Pi$ and a k-tuple $i=\{i_1,...,i_k\}$ of exponents, define $\prod_{s=1}^l \zeta(\sum_{j \in P_s} i_j)$.

The relations between the $\zeta$ and $S$ are: $S(i_1,i_2)=\zeta(i_1,i_2)+\zeta(i_1+i_2)$ and $S(i_1,i_2,i_3)=\zeta(i_1,i_2,i_3)+\zeta(i_1+i_2,i_3)+\zeta(i_1,i_2+i_3)+\zeta(i_1+i_2+i_3).$

=== Theorem 1 (Hoffman) ===
For any real $i_1,\cdots,i_k >1,$, $\sum_{{\sigma \in \Sigma_k}}S(i_{\sigma(1)}, \dots, i_{\sigma(k)}) = \sum_{\text{partitions } \Pi \text{ of } \{1,\dots,k\}}c(\Pi)\zeta(i,\Pi)$.

Proof. Assume the $i_j$ are all distinct. (There is no loss of generality, since we can take limits.) The left-hand side can be written as $\sum_{\sigma}\sum_{n_1\geq n_2 \geq \cdots \geq n_k \geq1} \frac{1}{{n^{i_1}}_{\sigma(1)}{n^{i_2}}_{\sigma(2)} \cdots {n^{i_k}}_{\sigma(k)} }$. Now thinking on the symmetric

group $\Sigma_k$ as acting on k-tuple $n = (1,\cdots,k)$ of positive integers. A given k-tuple $n=(n_1,\cdots,n_k)$ has an isotropy group

$\Sigma_k(n)$ and an associated partition $\Lambda$ of $(1,2,\cdots,k)$: $\Lambda$ is the set of equivalence classes of the relation given by $i \sim j$ iff $n_i=n_j$, and $\Sigma_k(n) = \{\sigma \in \Sigma_k : \sigma(i) \sim \forall i\}$. Now the term $\frac{1} {{n^{i_1}}_{\sigma(1)}{n^{i_2}}_{\sigma(2)} \cdots {n^{i_k}}_{\sigma(k)}}$ occurs on the left-hand side of $\sum_{{\sigma \in \Sigma_k}}S(i_{\sigma(1)}, \dots, i_{\sigma(k)}) = \sum_{\text{partitions } \Pi \text{ of } \{1,\dots,k\}}c(\Pi)\zeta(i,\Pi)$ exactly $\left| \Sigma_k(n) \right|$ times. It occurs on the right-hand side in those terms corresponding to partitions $\Pi$ that are refinements of $\Lambda$: letting $\succeq$ denote refinement, $\frac{1} {{n^{i_1}}_{\sigma(1)}{n^{i_2}}_{\sigma(2)} \cdots {n^{i_k}}_{\sigma(k)}}$ occurs $\sum_{\Pi\succeq\Lambda}(\Pi)$ times. Thus, the conclusion will follow if $\left| \Sigma_k(n) \right| =\sum_{\Pi\succeq\Lambda}c(\Pi)$ for any k-tuple $n=\{n_1,\cdots,n_k\}$ and associated partition $\Lambda$. To see this, note that $c(\Pi)$ counts the permutations having cycle type specified by $\Pi$: since any elements of $\Sigma_k(n)$ has a unique cycle type specified by a partition that refines $\Lambda$, the result follows.

For $k=3$, the theorem says $\sum_{{\sigma \in \Sigma_3}}S(i_{\sigma(1)},i_{\sigma(2)},i_{\sigma(3)}) = \zeta(i_1)\zeta(i_2)\zeta(i_3)+\zeta(i_1+i_2)\zeta(i_3)+\zeta(i_1)\zeta(i_2+i_3)+\zeta(i_1+i_3)\zeta(i_2)+2\zeta(i_1+i_2+i_3)$ for $i_1,i_2,i_3>1$. This is the main result of.

Having $\zeta(i_1,i_2,\cdots,i_k)=\sum_{n_1> n_2>\cdots n_k\geq1}\frac{1}{n_1^{i_1} n_2^{i_2}\cdots n_k^{i_k}}$. To state the analog of Theorem 1 for the $\zeta's$, we require one bit of notation. For a partition

$\Pi = \{P_1,\cdots,P_l\}$ of $\{1,2\cdots,k\}$, let $\tilde{c}(\Pi)=(-1)^{k-l}c(\Pi)$.

=== Theorem 2 (Hoffman) ===
For any real $i_1,\cdots,i_k>1$, $\sum_{{\sigma \in \Sigma_k}}\zeta(i_{\sigma(1)}, \dots, i_{\sigma(k)})=\sum_{\text{partitions } \Pi \text{ of } \{1,\dots,k\}}\tilde{c}(\Pi)\zeta(i,\Pi)$.

Proof. We follow the same line of argument as in the preceding proof. The left-hand side is now $\sum_{\sigma}\sum_{n_1 > n_2 > \cdots > n_k \geq1} \frac{1}{{n^{i_1}}_{\sigma(1)}{n^{i_2}}_{\sigma(2)} \cdots {n^{i_k}}_{\sigma(k)} }$, and a term $\frac{1}{n^{i_1}_{1}n^{i_2}_{2} \cdots n^{i_k}_{k}}$ occurs on the left-hand since once if all the $n_i$ are distinct, and not at all otherwise. Thus, it suffices to show
$$\sum_{\Pi\succeq\Lambda}\tilde{c}(\Pi)=\begin{cases} 1,\text{ if } \left| \Lambda \right|=k \\ 0, \text{ otherwise }. \end{cases}$$
(1)

To prove this, note first that the sign of $\tilde{c}(\Pi)$ is positive if the permutations of cycle type $\Pi$ are even, and negative if they are odd: thus, the left-hand side of (1) is the signed sum of the number of even and odd permutations in the isotropy group $\Sigma_k(n)$. But such an isotropy group has equal numbers of even and odd permutations unless it is trivial, i.e. unless the associated partition $\Lambda$ is $\{\{1\},\{2\},\cdots,\{k\}\}$.

== The sum and duality conjectures ==
We first state the sum conjecture, which is due to C. Moen.

Sum conjecture (Hoffman). For positive integers k and n, $\sum_{i_1+\cdots+i_k=n, i_1>1}\zeta(i_1,\cdots,i_k) = \zeta(n)$, where the sum is extended over k-tuples $i_1,\cdots,i_k$ of positive integers with $i_1>1$.

Three remarks concerning this conjecture are in order. First, it implies $\sum_{i_1+\cdots+i_k=n, i_1>1}S(i_1,\cdots,i_k)={n-1\choose k-1}\zeta(n)$. Second, in the case $k=2$ it says that $\zeta(n-1,1)+\zeta(n-2,2)+\cdots+\zeta(2,n-2)=\zeta(n)$, or using the relation between the $\zeta's$ and $S's$ and Theorem 1, $2S(n-1,1)=(n+1)\zeta(n)-\sum_{k=2}^{n-2}\zeta(k)\zeta(n-k).$

This was proved by Euler and has been rediscovered several times, in particular by Williams. Finally, C. Moen has proved the same conjecture for k=3 by lengthy but elementary arguments. For the duality conjecture, we first define an involution $\tau$ on the set $\Im$ of finite sequences of positive integers whose first element is greater than 1. Let $\Tau$ be the set of strictly increasing finite sequences of positive integers, and let $\Sigma : \Im \rightarrow \Tau$ be the function that sends a sequence in $\Im$ to its sequence of partial sums. If $\Tau_n$ is the set of sequences in $\Tau$ whose last element is at most $n$, we have two commuting involutions $R_n$ and $C_n$ on $\Tau_n$ defined by $R_n(a_1,a_2,\dots,a_l)=(n+1-a_l,n+1-a_{l-1},\dots,n+1-a_1)$ and $C_n(a_1,\dots,a_l)$ = complement of $\{a_1,\dots,a_l\}$ in $\{1,2,\dots,n\}$ arranged in increasing order. The our definition of $\tau$ is $\tau(I) = \Sigma^{-1}R_nC_n\Sigma(I) = \Sigma^{-1}C_nR_n\Sigma(I)$ for $I=(i_1,i_2,\dots,i_k) \in \Im$ with $i_1+\cdots+i_k=n$.

For example, $\tau(3,4,1) = \Sigma^{-1}C_8R_8(3,7,8) = \Sigma^{-1}(3,4,5,7,8) = (3,1,1,2,1).$ We shall say the sequences $(i_1,\dots,i_k)$ and $\tau(i_1,\dots,i_k)$ are dual to each other, and refer to a sequence fixed by $\tau$ as self-dual.

Duality conjecture (Hoffman). If $(h_1,\dots,h_{n-k})$ is dual to $(i_1,\dots,i_k)$, then $\zeta(h_1,\dots,h_{n-k}) = \zeta(i_1,\dots,i_k)$.

This sum conjecture is also known as Sum Theorem, and it may be expressed as follows: the Riemann zeta value of an integer n ≥ 2 is equal to the sum of all the valid (i.e. with s_{1} > 1) MZVs of the partitions of length k and weight n, with 1 ≤ k ≤ n − 1. In formula:

$$\sum_\stackrel{s_1 + \cdots + s_k=n}{s_1>1}\zeta(s_1, \ldots, s_k) = \zeta(n).$$

For example, with length k = 2 and weight n = 7:

$$\zeta(6,1)+\zeta(5,2)+\zeta(4,3)+\zeta(3,4)+\zeta(2,5) = \zeta(7).$$

== Euler sum with all possible alternations of sign ==
The Euler sum with alternations of sign appears in studies of the non-alternating Euler sum.

=== Notation ===
$\sum_{n=1}^\infty \frac{H_n^{(b)}(-1)^{(n+1)}}{(n+1)^a}=\zeta(\bar{a},b)$ with $H_n^{(b)}=+1+\frac{1}{2^b}+\frac{1}{3^b}+\cdots$ are the generalized harmonic numbers.
$\sum_{n=1}^\infty \frac{\bar{H}_n^{(b)}}{(n+1)^a}=\zeta(a,\bar{b})$ with $\bar{H}_n^{(b)}=-1+\frac{1}{2^b}-\frac{1}{3^b}+\cdots$
$$\sum_{n=1}^\infty \frac{\bar{H}_n^{(b)}(-1)^{(n+1)}}{(n+1)^a}=\zeta(\bar{a},\bar{b})$$
$\sum_{n=1}^\infty \frac{(-1)^{n}}{(n+2)^a}\sum_{n=1}^\infty \frac{\bar{H}_n^{(c)}(-1)^{(n+1)}}{(n+1)^b} =\zeta(\bar{a},\bar{b},\bar{c})$ with $\bar{H}_n^{(c)}=-1+\frac{1}{2^c}-\frac{1}{3^c}+\cdots$
$\sum_{n=1}^\infty \frac{(-1)^{n}}{(n+2)^a}\sum_{n=1}^\infty \frac{H_n^{(c)}}{(n+1)^b}=\zeta(\bar{a},b,c)$ with $H_n^{(c)}=+1+\frac{1}{2^c}+\frac{1}{3^c}+\cdots$
$$\sum_{n=1}^\infty \frac{1}{(n+2)^a}\sum_{n=1}^\infty \frac{H_n^{(c)}(-1)^{(n+1)}}{(n+1)^b}=\zeta(a,\bar{b},c)$$
$$\sum_{n=1}^\infty \frac{1}{(n+2)^a}\sum_{n=1}^\infty \frac{\bar{H}_n^{(c)}}{(n+1)^b}=\zeta(a,b,\bar{c})$$

As a variant of the Dirichlet eta function we define

$\phi(s) = \frac{1-2^{(s-1)}} {2^{(s-1)}} \zeta(s)$ with $s>1$
$$\phi(1) = -\ln 2$$

=== Reflection formula ===
The reflection formula $\zeta(a,b)+\zeta(b,a)=\zeta(a)\zeta(b)-\zeta(a+b)$ can be generalized as follows:

$$\zeta(a,\bar{b})+\zeta(\bar{b},a)=\zeta(a)\phi(b)-\phi(a+b)$$
$$\zeta(\bar{a},b)+\zeta(b,\bar{a})=\zeta(b)\phi(a)-\phi(a+b)$$
$$\zeta(\bar{a},\bar{b})+\zeta(\bar{b},\bar{a})=\phi(a)\phi(b)-\zeta(a+b)$$

if $a=b$ we have $\zeta(\bar{a},\bar{a})=\tfrac{1}{2}\Big[\phi^2(a)-\zeta(2a)\Big]$

=== Other relations ===
Using the series definition it is easy to prove:

$\zeta(a,b)+\zeta(a,\bar{b})+\zeta(\bar{a},b)+\zeta(\bar{a},\bar{b})=\frac{\zeta(a,b)}{2^{(a+b-2)}}$ with $a>1$
$\zeta(a,b,c)+\zeta(a,b,\bar{c})+\zeta(a,\bar{b},c)+\zeta(\bar{a},b,c)+\zeta(a,\bar{b},\bar{c})+\zeta(\bar{a},b,\bar{c})+\zeta(\bar{a},\bar{b},c)+\zeta(\bar{a},\bar{b},\bar{c})=\frac{\zeta(a,b,c)}{2^{(a+b+c-3)}}$ with $a>1$

A further useful relation is:

$$\zeta(a,b)+\zeta(\bar{a},\bar{b})=\sum_{s>0} (a+b-s-1)!\Big[\frac{Z_a(a+b-s,s)}{(a-s)!(b-1)!}+\frac{Z_b(a+b-s,s)}{(b-s)!(a-1)!}\Big]$$

where $Z_a(s,t)=\zeta(s,t)+\zeta(\bar{s},t)-\frac{\Big[\zeta(s,t)+\zeta(s+t)\Big]}{2^{(s-1)}}$ and $Z_b(s,t)=\frac{\zeta(s,t)}{2^{(s-1)}}$

Note that $s$ must be used for all value $>1$ for which the argument of the factorials is $\geqslant0$

== Other results ==
For all positive integers $a,b,\dots,k$:

$\sum_{n=2}^{\infty} \zeta(n,k) = \zeta(k+1)$ or more generally:
$$\sum_{n=2}^{\infty} \zeta(n,a,b,\dots,k) = \zeta(a+1,b,\dots,k)$$

$$\sum_{n=2}^{\infty} \zeta(n,\bar{k}) = -\phi(k+1)$$
$$\sum_{n=2}^{\infty} \zeta(n,\bar{a},b) = \zeta(\overline{a+1},b)$$
$$\sum_{n=2}^{\infty} \zeta(n,a,\bar{b}) = \zeta(a+1,\bar{b})$$
$$\sum_{n=2}^{\infty} \zeta(n,\bar{a},\bar{b}) = \zeta(\overline{a+1},\bar{b})$$

$$\lim_{k \to \infty}\zeta(n,k) = \zeta(n)-1$$

$$1-\zeta(2)+\zeta(3)-\zeta(4)+\cdots=|\frac{1}{2}|$$

$$\zeta(a,a)=\tfrac{1}{2}\Big[(\zeta(a))^{2}-\zeta(2a)\Big]$$

$$\zeta(a,a,a)=\tfrac{1}{6}(\zeta(a))^{3}+\tfrac{1}{3}\zeta(3a)-\tfrac{1}{2}\zeta(a)\zeta(2a)$$

== Mordell–Tornheim zeta values ==
The Mordell–Tornheim zeta function, introduced by Matsumoto (2003) who was motivated by the papers Mordell (1958) and Tornheim (1950), is defined by

$$\zeta_{MT,r}(s_1,\dots,s_r;s_{r+1})=\sum_{m_1,\dots,m_r>0}\frac{1}{ m_1^{s_1}\cdots m_r^{s_r}(m_1+\dots+m_r)^{s_{r+1}}}$$

It is a special case of the Shintani zeta function.
