= Artin–Mazur zeta function =

In mathematics, the Artin–Mazur zeta function, named after Michael Artin and Barry Mazur, is a function that is used for studying the iterated functions that occur in dynamical systems and fractals.

It is defined from a given function $f$ as the formal power series

$$\zeta_f(z)=\exp \left(\sum_{n=1}^\infty
\bigl|\operatorname{Fix} (f^n)\bigr| \frac {z^n}{n}\right),$$

where $\operatorname{Fix} (f^n)$ is the set of fixed points of the $n$th iterate of the function $f$, and $|\operatorname{Fix} (f^n)|$ is the number of fixed points (i.e. the cardinality of that set).

Note that the zeta function is defined only if the set of fixed points is finite for each $n$. This definition is formal in that the series does not always have a positive radius of convergence.

The Artin–Mazur zeta function is invariant under topological conjugation.

The Milnor–Thurston theorem states that the Artin–Mazur zeta function of an interval map $f$ is the inverse of the kneading determinant of $f$.

== Analogues ==
The Artin–Mazur zeta function is formally similar to the local zeta function, when a diffeomorphism on a compact manifold replaces the Frobenius mapping for an algebraic variety over a finite field.

The Ihara zeta function of a graph can be interpreted as an example of the Artin–Mazur zeta function.

== See also ==
- Lefschetz number
- Lefschetz zeta-function
