= Joseph Ser =

French mathematician

Joseph Ser (1875–1954) was a French mathematician, of whom little was known till now. He published 45 papers between 1900 and 1954, among which four monographs, edited in Paris by Henry Gauthier-Villars. In the main, he worked on number theory and infinite series.

He got important results in the domain of factorial series. His representation of Euler's constant as a series of rational terms is well known. It was used in 1926 by Paul Appell (1855–1930), in an unsuccessful attempt to prove the irrationality of Euler's constant.
