= Motivic zeta function =

In algebraic geometry, the motivic zeta function of a smooth algebraic variety $X$ is the formal power series:

$$Z(X,t)=\sum_{n=0}^\infty [X^{(n)}]t^n$$

Here $X^{(n)}$ is the $n$-th symmetric power of $X$, i.e., the quotient of $X^n$ by the action of the symmetric group $S_n$, and $[X^{(n)}]$ is the class of $X^{(n)}$ in the ring of motives (see below).

If the ground field is finite, and one applies the counting measure to $Z(X,t)$, one obtains the local zeta function of $X$.

If the ground field is the complex numbers, and one applies Euler characteristic with compact supports to $Z(X,t)$, one obtains $1/(1-t)^{\chi(X)}$.

== Motivic measures ==
A motivic measure is a map $\mu$ from the set of finite type schemes over a field $k$ to a commutative ring $A$, satisfying the three properties

$\mu(X)\,$ depends only on the isomorphism class of $X$,
$\mu(X)=\mu(Z)+\mu(X\setminus Z)$ if $Z$ is a closed subscheme of $X$,
$$\mu(X_1\times X_2)=\mu(X_1)\mu(X_2)$$.

For example if $k$ is a finite field and $A={\mathbb Z}$ is the ring of integers, then $\mu(X)=\#(X(k))$ defines a motivic measure, the counting measure.

If the ground field is the complex numbers, then Euler characteristic with compact supports defines a motivic measure with values in the integers.

The zeta function with respect to a motivic measure $\mu$ is the formal power series in $A[[t]]$ given by

$$Z_\mu(X,t)=\sum_{n=0}^\infty\mu(X^{(n)})t^n$$.

There is a universal motivic measure. It takes values in the K-ring of varieties, $A=K(V)$, which is the ring generated by the symbols $[X]$, for all varieties $X$, subject to the relations

$[X']=[X]\,$ if $X'$ and $X$ are isomorphic,
$[X]=[Z]+[X\setminus Z]$ if $Z$ is a closed subvariety of $X$,
$$[X_1\times X_2]=[X_1]\cdot[X_2]$$.

The universal motivic measure gives rise to the motivic zeta function.

== Examples ==
Let $\mathbb L=[{\mathbb A}^1]$ denote the class of the affine line.

$$Z({\mathbb A},t)=\frac{1}{1-{\mathbb L} t}$$

$$Z({\mathbb A}^n,t)=\frac{1}{1-{\mathbb L}^n t}$$

$$Z({\mathbb P}^n,t)=\prod_{i=0}^n\frac{1}{1-{\mathbb L}^i t}$$

If $X$ is a smooth projective irreducible curve of genus $g$ admitting a line bundle of degree 1, and the motivic measure takes values in a field in which ${\mathbb L}$ is invertible, then

$$Z(X,t)=\frac{P(t)}{(1-t)(1-{\mathbb L}t)}\,,$$

where $P(t)$ is a polynomial of degree $2g$. Thus, in this case, the motivic zeta function is rational. In higher dimension, the motivic zeta function is not always rational.

If $S$ is a smooth surface over an algebraically closed field of characteristic $0$, then the generating function for the motives of the Hilbert schemes of $S$ can be expressed in terms of the motivic zeta function by Göttsche's Formula

$$\sum_{n=0}^\infty[S^{[n]}]t^n=\prod_{m=1}^\infty Z(S,{\mathbb L}^{m-1}t^m)$$

Here $S^{[n]}$ is the Hilbert scheme of length $n$ subschemes of $S$. For the affine plane this formula gives

$$\sum_{n=0}^\infty[({\mathbb A}^2)^{[n]}]t^n=\prod_{m=1}^\infty \frac{1}{1-{\mathbb L}^{m+1}t^m}$$

This is essentially the partition function.
