= Period (number theory) =

Numbers expressible as integrals of algebraic functions

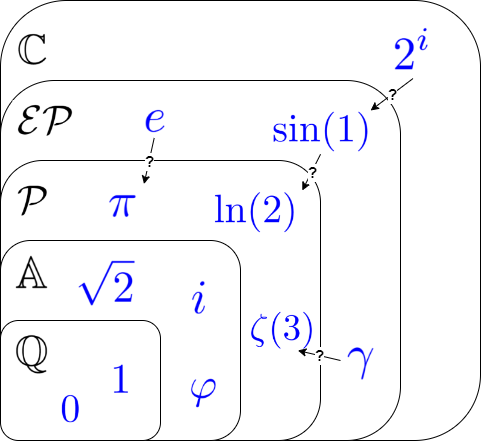
The rational numbers $\Q$, algebraic numbers $\mathbb{A}$, algebraic periods $\mathcal{P}$ and exponential periods $\mathcal{EP}$ as subsets of the complex numbers $\C$.

In mathematics, a period, or algebraic period, is a complex number that can be expressed as an integral of an algebraic function over an algebraic domain. The periods are a class of numbers which includes, alongside the algebraic numbers, many well known mathematical constants such as the number π. Sums and products of periods remain periods, so that the periods form a ring, commonly denoted $\mathcal P$.

Maxim Kontsevich and Don Zagier gave a survey of periods and introduced some conjectures about them.

Periods play an important role in the theory of differential equations and transcendental numbers as well as in open problems of modern arithmetic geometry. They also appear when computing the integrals that arise from Feynman diagrams, and there has been intensive work trying to understand the connections.

== Definition ==
A number $\alpha$ is a period if it can be expressed as an integral of the form

$$\alpha = \int_{P(x_1,\ldots,x_n)\ge 0}Q(x_1,\ldots,x_n)\ \mathrm{d}x_1\ldots\mathrm{d}x_n,$$

where $P$ is a polynomial and $Q$ a rational function on $\R^n$ with rational coefficients. A complex number is a period if its real and imaginary parts are periods.

An equivalent definition allows $P$ and $Q$ to be algebraic functions. The coefficients of the rational functions and polynomials can also be generalized to algebraic numbers because irrational algebraic numbers are expressible in terms of areas of suitable domains.

In the other direction, $Q$ can be restricted to be the constant function $1$ or $-1$, by replacing the integrand with an integral of $\pm 1$ over a region defined by a polynomial in additional variables.

In other words, a (nonnegative) period is the volume of a region in $\R^n$ defined by polynomial inequalities with rational coefficients.

== Properties and motivation ==
Periods are intended to bridge the gap between the countable algebraic numbers, whose properties have been well-studied, and transcendental numbers, which are uncountable and hard to describe apart from a very few specific examples. The latter are also not generally computable. Periods include some of those transcendental numbers that can be described in an algorithmic way and only contain a finite amount of information.

The ring of periods $\mathcal P$ lies in between the fields of algebraic numbers $\mathbb \overline{Q}$ and complex numbers $\C$ and is countable. The periods themselves are all computable, and in particular definable.

== Numbers known to be periods ==
The following numbers are among the ones known to be periods:

| Number | Example of period integral |
|---|---|
| Any algebraic number $\alpha$. | $\alpha=\int_0^{\alpha} \mathrm{d}x$ |
| The natural logarithm of any positive algebraic number $\alpha>0$. | $\ln(\alpha)=\int_1^{\alpha}\frac{1}{x}\ \mathrm{d}x$ |
| The inverse trigonometric functions at algebraic numbers $\alpha$ in their domain. | $\arctan(\alpha)=\int_0^{\alpha}\frac{1}{1+x^2}\ \mathrm{d}x$ |
| The inverse hyperbolic functions at algebraic numbers $\alpha$ in their domain. | $\text{artanh}(\alpha)=\int_0^{\alpha}\frac{1}{1-x^2}\ \mathrm{d}x$ |
| The number π. | $\pi= \int_0^1\frac{4}{x^2+1}\ \mathrm{d}x$ |
| Integer values of the Riemann zeta function $\zeta(s)$ for $s\geq 2$ as well as several multiple zeta values. In particular, even powers $\pi^{2n}$ and Apéry's constant $\zeta(3)$. | $\zeta(3)=\int_0^1 \int_0^1 \int_0^1 \frac{\mathrm dx\mathrm d y\mathrm dz}{1-xyz}$ |
| Integer values of the Dirichlet beta function $\beta(s)$. In particular, odd powers $\pi^{2n+1}$ and Catalan's constant $G$. | $G=\int_0^1 \int_0^1 \frac{\mathrm dx\mathrm d y}{1+x^2y^2}$ |
| Certain values of the Clausen function $\text{Cl}_2(z)$ at rational multiples of $\pi$; in particular, the Gieseking constant $\text{Cl}_2(\tfrac13\pi)$. | $\text{Cl}_2(\tfrac13\pi)=2\int_0^1\int_1^{1+y} \frac{\mathrm dx \mathrm dy}{x\sqrt{(1-y)(3+y)}}$ |
| Rational values of the polygamma function $\psi_m(z)$ for $z\in\mathbb Q^+$ in its domain and $m\in\Z^+$. | $\psi_m(z)= -\int_0^1 \frac{y^{z-1}}{1-y}\left[\int_1^y \frac{\mathrm dx}{x}\right]^m\,\mathrm{d}y$ |
| The polylogarithm $\text{Li}_s(\alpha)$ at algebraic numbers $\alpha$ in its domain and $s\in\Z^+$. | $\text{Li}_2(\alpha)=-\int_0^{\alpha}\int_1^{1-y}\frac{1}{xy}\ \mathrm d x \mathrm dy$ |
| The inverse tangent integral $\text{Ti}_n(\alpha)$ at algebraic numbers $\alpha$ in its domain and $n\in\Z^+$. | $\text{Ti}_2(\alpha)=\int_0^{\alpha}\int_0^y\frac{1}{y(1+x^2)}\ \mathrm d x \mathrm dy$ |
| Values of elliptic integrals with algebraic bounds; in particular, the perimeter $P$ of an ellipse with algebraic radii $a$ and $b$. | $P=\int_{-b}^b \sqrt{1+\frac{a^2x^2}{b^4-b^2x^2}}\,\mathrm{d}x$ |
| Several numbers related to the gamma and beta functions, such as values $\Gamma(p/q)^q$ for $p,q\in\Z^+$ and $\Beta(\tfrac1n,\tfrac1n)$ for $n\in\Z^+$; in particular, the lemniscate constant $\varpi$. | $\Beta\left(\tfrac1n,\tfrac1n\right)=2n\int_0^1\sqrt[n]{1-x^n}\ \mathrm dx$ |
| Special values of hypergeometric functions at algebraic arguments. | $_2F_1(-\tfrac12,\tfrac13;\tfrac43;-1)=\frac13\int_0^1 \frac{\sqrt{1+x}}{x^{2/3}}\mathrm dx$ |
| Special values of modular forms at certain arguments. | |
| Sums and products of periods. | |

== Open questions ==
Many of the constants known to be periods are also given by integrals of transcendental functions. Kontsevich and Zagier note that there "seems to be no universal rule explaining why certain infinite sums or integrals of transcendental functions are periods".

They conjectured that, if a period is given by two different integrals, then each integral can be transformed into the other using only the linearity of integrals (in both the integrand and the domain), changes of variables, and the fundamental theorem of calculus

$$\int_a^b f'(x) \, dx = f(b) - f(a)$$

(or, more generally, Stokes' theorem).

A useful property of algebraic numbers is that equality between two algebraic expressions can be determined algorithmically. The conjecture of Kontsevich and Zagier would imply that equality of periods is also decidable: inequality of computable reals is known to be recursively enumerable; conversely, if two integrals agree, then an algorithm could confirm so by trying all possible ways to transform one of them into the other one.

Further open questions consist of proving which known mathematical constants do not belong to the ring of periods. An example of a real number that is not a period is given by Chaitin's constant Ω. Any other non-computable number also gives an example of a real number that is not a period. It is also possible to construct artificial examples of computable numbers which are not periods. However there are no computable numbers proven not to be periods which have not been artificially constructed for that purpose.

It is conjectured that $1/\pi$, Euler's number $e$ and the Euler–Mascheroni constant $\gamma$ are not periods.

== Extensions ==
The ring of periods can be extended to the ring of extended periods $\hat \mathcal P$ by adjoining the element $1/\pi$.

Permitting the integrand $Q$ to be the product of an algebraic function and the exponential of an algebraic function results in another extension: the exponential periods, usually denoted $\mathcal {EP}$. They also form a ring and are countable.

The following numbers are among the ones known to be exponential periods:

| Number | Example of exponential period integral |
|---|---|
| Any algebraic period $I\in\mathcal P$ | |
| Numbers of the form $e^\alpha$ with $\alpha\in\overline{\mathbb Q}$. In particular: The number $e$. | $e^\alpha=\int_{-\infty}^\alpha e^{x}\mathrm dx$ |
| The functions $\sin(\alpha)$ and $\cos(\alpha)$ at algebraic values. | $\sin(\alpha)=\frac12\int_{-\alpha}^{\alpha}e^{ix}\mathrm dx$ |
| The functions $\sinh(\alpha)$ and $\cosh(\alpha)$ at algebraic values. | $\sinh(\alpha)=\frac12\int_{-\alpha}^{\alpha}e^{x}\mathrm dx$ |
| Rational values of the gamma function $\Gamma(p/q)$ with $p,q\in\Z^+$. In particular: $\sqrt \pi$. | $\Gamma(p/q) = \int_{0}^\infty x^{\frac pq-1} e^{-x} \mathrm d x$ |
| Euler's constant $\gamma$ and positive rational values of the digamma function $\psi_0 (p/q)$. | $\gamma=-\int_{0}^\infty \int_1^y \frac{e^{-y}}{x}\ \mathrm d x\mathrm dy$ |
| Algebraic values of the exponential integral and the Gompertz constant $\delta$. | $\delta=\int_{0}^\infty \frac{1}{1+x}e^{-x}\mathrm d x$ |
| Algebraic values of several trigonometric integrals. | $\text{Si}(\alpha)=\int_0^\alpha\int_{-y}^y\frac{e^{ix}}{2y}\mathrm d x\mathrm dy$ |
| Certain values of Bessel functions. | |
| Sums and products of exponential periods. | |

== See also ==
- Gauss–Manin connection
- Jacobian variety
- L-function
- Mathematical constant
- Mixed motives (math)
- Tannakian formalism
- Transcendental number theory
