= Psi function =

Psi function can refer, in mathematics, to

- the ordinal collapsing function $\psi(\alpha)$
- the Dedekind psi function $\psi(n)$
- the Chebyshev function $\psi(x)$
- the polygamma function $\psi^m(z)$ or its special cases
  - the digamma function $\psi(z)$
  - the trigamma function $\psi^1(z)$

and in physics to

- the quantum mechanical wave function.
