= Clausen function =

Transcendental single-variable function

Graph of the Clausen function Cl_{2}(θ)

In mathematics, the Clausen function, introduced by Thomas Clausen (1832), is a transcendental, special function of a single variable. It can be expressed in the form of a definite integral, a trigonometric series, and various other forms. It is intimately connected with the polylogarithm, inverse tangent integral, polygamma function, Riemann zeta function, Dirichlet eta function, and Dirichlet beta function.

The Clausen function of order 2 – often referred to as the Clausen function, despite being but one of a class of many – is given by the integral:

$$\operatorname{Cl}_2(\varphi)=-\int_0^\varphi \log\left|2\sin\frac{x}{2} \right|\, dx$$

where log denotes the natural logarithm. In the range $0 < \varphi < 2\pi\,$ the sine function inside the absolute value sign remains strictly positive, so the absolute value signs may be omitted. The Clausen function also has the Fourier series representation:

$$\operatorname{Cl}_2(\varphi)=\sum_{k=1}^\infty \frac{\sin k\varphi}{k^2} = \sin\varphi +\frac{\sin 2\varphi}{2^2}+\frac{\sin 3\varphi}{3^2}+\frac{\sin 4\varphi}{4^2}+ \cdots$$

The Clausen functions, as a class of functions, feature extensively in many areas of modern mathematical research, particularly in relation to the evaluation of many classes of logarithmic and polylogarithmic integrals, both definite and indefinite. They also have numerous applications with regard to the summation of hypergeometric series, summations involving the inverse of the central binomial coefficient, sums of the polygamma function, and Dirichlet L-series.

== Basic properties ==
The Clausen function (of order 2) has simple zeros at all (integer) multiples of $\pi, \,$ since if $k\in \Z$ is an integer, then $\sin k\pi=0$,

$$\operatorname{Cl}_2(m\pi) = 0, \quad m= 0,\, \pm 1,\, \pm 2,\, \pm 3,\, \cdots$$

It has maxima at $\theta = \frac{\pi}{3}+2m\pi \quad[m\in\Z]$

$$\operatorname{Cl}_2\left(\frac{\pi}{3}+2m\pi \right) =1.01494160 \ldots$$

and minima at $\theta = -\frac{\pi}{3}+2m\pi \quad[m\in\Z]$

$$\operatorname{Cl}_2\left(-\frac{\pi}{3}+2m\pi \right) =-1.01494160 \ldots$$

The following properties are immediate consequences of the series definition:

$$\operatorname{Cl}_2(\theta+2m\pi) = \operatorname{Cl}_2(\theta)$$
$$\operatorname{Cl}_2(-\theta) = -\operatorname{Cl}_2(\theta)$$

See Lu & Perez (1992).

== General definition ==
Standard Clausen functions

Glaisher–Clausen functions

More generally, one defines the two generalized Clausen functions:

$$\operatorname{S}_z(\theta) = \sum_{k=1}^\infty \frac{\sin k\theta}{k^z}$$
$$\operatorname{C}_z(\theta) = \sum_{k=1}^\infty \frac{\cos k\theta}{k^z}$$

which are valid for complex z with Re z >1. The definition may be extended to all of the complex plane through analytic continuation.

When z is replaced with a non-negative integer, the standard Clausen functions are defined by the following Fourier series:

$$\operatorname{Cl}_{2m+2}(\theta) = \sum_{k=1}^\infty \frac{\sin k\theta }{k^{2m+2}}$$
$$\operatorname{Cl}_{2m+1}(\theta) = \sum_{k=1}^\infty \frac{\cos k\theta }{k^{2m+1}}$$
$$\operatorname{Sl}_{2m+2}(\theta) = \sum_{k=1}^\infty \frac{\cos k\theta }{k^{2m+2}}$$
$$\operatorname{Sl}_{2m+1}(\theta) = \sum_{k=1}^\infty \frac{\sin k\theta }{k^{2m+1}}$$

N.B. The SL-type Clausen functions have the alternative notation $\operatorname{Gl}_m(\theta)\,$ and are sometimes referred to as the Glaisher–Clausen functions (after James Whitbread Lee Glaisher, hence the GL-notation).

== Relation to the Bernoulli polynomials ==
The SL-type Clausen function are polynomials in $\, \theta\,$, and are closely related to the Bernoulli polynomials. This connection is apparent from the Fourier series representations of the Bernoulli polynomials:

$$B_{2n-1}(x)=\frac{2(-1)^n(2n-1)!}{(2\pi)^{2n-1}} \, \sum_{k=1}^\infty \frac{\sin 2\pi kx}{k^{2n-1}}.$$
$$B_{2n}(x)=\frac{2(-1)^{n-1}(2n)!}{(2\pi)^{2n}} \, \sum_{k=1}^\infty \frac{\cos 2\pi kx}{k^{2n}}.$$

Setting $\, x= \theta/2\pi \,$ in the above, and then rearranging the terms gives the following closed form (polynomial) expressions:

$$\operatorname{Sl}_{2m}(\theta) = \frac{(-1)^{m-1}(2\pi)^{2m}}{2(2m)!} B_{2m}\left(\frac{\theta}{2\pi}\right),$$
$$\operatorname{Sl}_{2m-1}(\theta) = \frac{(-1)^{m}(2\pi)^{2m-1}}{2(2m-1)!} B_{2m-1}\left(\frac{\theta}{2\pi}\right),$$

where the Bernoulli polynomials $\, B_n(x)\,$ are defined in terms of the Bernoulli numbers $\, B_n \equiv B_n(0)\,$ by the relation:

$$B_n(x)=\sum_{j=0}^n\binom{n}{j} B_jx^{n-j}.$$

Explicit evaluations derived from the above include:

$$\operatorname{Sl}_1(\theta)= \frac{\pi}{2}-\frac \theta 2,$$
$$\operatorname{Sl}_2(\theta)= \frac{\pi^2}{6}-\frac{\pi\theta} 2 +\frac{\theta^2}{4},$$
$$\operatorname{Sl}_3(\theta)= \frac{\pi^2\theta}{6} -\frac{\pi\theta^2}{4}+\frac{\theta^3}{12},$$
$$\operatorname{Sl}_4(\theta)= \frac{\pi^4}{90}-\frac{\pi^2\theta^2}{12}+\frac{\pi\theta^3}{12}-\frac{\theta^4}{48}.$$

== Duplication formula ==
For $0 < \theta < \pi$, the duplication formula can be proven directly from the series or integral definition (see also Lu & Perez (1992) for the result – although no proof is given):

$$\operatorname{Cl}_2(2\theta) = 2\operatorname{Cl}_2(\theta) - 2\operatorname{Cl}_2(\pi-\theta)$$

Denoting Catalan's constant by $K=\operatorname{Cl}_2\left(\frac{\pi}{2}\right)$, immediate consequences of the duplication formula include the relations:

$$\operatorname{Cl}_2\left(\frac{\pi}{4}\right)- \operatorname{Cl}_2 \left(\frac{3\pi} 4\right)=\frac K 2$$
$$2\operatorname{Cl}_2\left(\frac{\pi}{3}\right)= 3\operatorname{Cl}_2 \left(\frac{2\pi} 3\right)$$

For higher order Clausen functions, duplication formulae can be obtained from the one given above; simply replace $\, \theta \,$ with the dummy variable $x$, and integrate over the interval $\, [0, \theta]. \,$ Applying the same process repeatedly yields:

$$\operatorname{Cl}_3(2\theta) = 4\operatorname{Cl}_3(\theta) + 4\operatorname{Cl}_3(\pi-\theta)$$
$$\operatorname{Cl}_4(2\theta) = 8\operatorname{Cl}_4(\theta) - 8\operatorname{Cl}_4(\pi-\theta)$$
$$\operatorname{Cl}_5(2\theta) = 16\operatorname{Cl}_5(\theta) + 16 \operatorname{Cl}_5(\pi-\theta)$$
$$\operatorname{Cl}_6(2\theta) = 32\operatorname{Cl}_6(\theta) - 32 \operatorname{Cl}_6(\pi-\theta)$$

And more generally, upon induction on $\, m, \; m \ge 1$

$$\operatorname{Cl}_{m+1}(2\theta) = 2^m\left[\operatorname{Cl}_{m+1}(\theta) + (-1)^m \operatorname{Cl}_{m+1}(\pi-\theta) \right]$$

Use of the generalized duplication formula allows for an extension of the result for the Clausen function of order 2, involving Catalan's constant. For $\, m \in \Z \ge 1\,$

$$\operatorname{Cl}_{2m}\left(\frac \pi 2 \right) = 2^{2m-1} \left[\operatorname{Cl}_{2m}\left(\frac{\pi}{4}\right)- \operatorname{Cl}_{2m}\left(\frac{3\pi}{4}\right) \right] = \beta(2m)$$

Where $\, \beta(x) \,$ is the Dirichlet beta function.

=== Proof of the duplication formula ===
From the integral definition,

$$\operatorname{Cl}_2(2\theta)=-\int_0^{2\theta} \log\left| 2 \sin \frac{x}{2} \right| \,dx$$

Apply the duplication formula for the sine function, $\sin x = 2\sin\frac{x}{2}\cos\frac{x}{2}$ to obtain

$$\begin{align}
& -\int_0^{2\theta} \log\left| \left(2 \sin \frac{x}{4} \right)\left(2 \cos \frac{x}{4}  \right) \right| \,dx \\
= {} & -\int_0^{2\theta} \log\left| 2 \sin \frac{x}{4} \right| \,dx -\int_0^{2\theta} \log\left| 2 \cos \frac{x}{4} \right| \,dx
\end{align}$$

Apply the substitution $x=2y, dx=2\, dy$ on both integrals:

$$\begin{align}
& -2\int_0^\theta \log\left| 2 \sin \frac{x}{2} \right| \,dx -2\int_0^\theta \log\left| 2 \cos \frac{x}{2} \right| \,dx \\
= {} & 2\, \operatorname{Cl}_2(\theta) -2\int_0^\theta  \log\left| 2 \cos \frac{x}{2} \right| \,dx
\end{align}$$

On that last integral, set $y=\pi-x, \, x= \pi-y, \, dx = -dy$, and use the trigonometric identity $\cos(x-y)=\cos x\cos y - \sin x\sin y$ to show that:

$$\begin{align}
& \cos\left(\frac{\pi-y}{2}\right) = \sin \frac{y}{2} \\
\Longrightarrow \qquad & \operatorname{Cl}_2(2\theta)=2\, \operatorname{Cl}_2(\theta) -2\int_0^\theta  \log\left| 2 \cos \frac{x}{2} \right| \,dx \\
= {} & 2\, \operatorname{Cl}_2(\theta) +2\int_{\pi}^{\pi-\theta} \log\left| 2 \sin \frac{y}{2} \right| \,dy \\
= {} & 2\, \operatorname{Cl}_2(\theta) -2\, \operatorname{Cl}_2(\pi-\theta) + 2\, \operatorname{Cl}_2(\pi)
\end{align}$$

$$\operatorname{Cl}_2(\pi) = 0 \,$$

Therefore,

$$\operatorname{Cl}_2(2\theta)=2\, \operatorname{Cl}_2(\theta)-2\, \operatorname{Cl}_2(\pi-\theta)\, . \, \Box$$

== Derivatives of general-order Clausen functions ==
Direct differentiation of the Fourier series expansions for the Clausen functions give:

$$\frac{d}{d\theta}\operatorname{Cl}_{2m+2}(\theta) = \frac{d}{d\theta}\sum_{k=1}^\infty \frac{\sin k\theta }{k^{2m+2}}=\sum_{k=1}^\infty \frac{\cos k\theta }{k^{2m+1}}=\operatorname{Cl}_{2m+1}(\theta)$$
$$\frac{d}{d\theta}\operatorname{Cl}_{2m+1}(\theta) = \frac{d}{d\theta}\sum_{k=1}^\infty \frac{\cos k\theta }{k^{2m+1}}=-\sum_{k=1}^\infty \frac{\sin k\theta }{k^{2m}}=-\operatorname{Cl}_{2m}(\theta)$$
$$\frac{d}{d\theta}\operatorname{Sl}_{2m+2}(\theta) = \frac{d}{d\theta}\sum_{k=1}^\infty \frac{\cos k\theta }{k^{2m+2}}= -\sum_{k=1}^\infty \frac{\sin k\theta }{k^{2m+1}}=-\operatorname{Sl}_{2m+1} (\theta)$$
$$\frac{d}{d\theta}\operatorname{Sl}_{2m+1}(\theta) = \frac{d}{d\theta}\sum_{k=1}^\infty \frac{\sin k\theta }{k^{2m+1}}=\sum_{k=1}^\infty \frac{\cos k\theta }{k^{2m}}=\operatorname{Sl}_{2m} (\theta)$$

By appealing to the First Fundamental Theorem Of Calculus, we also have:

$$\frac{d}{d\theta}\operatorname{Cl}_2(\theta) = \frac{d}{d\theta} \left[ -\int_0^\theta  \log \left| 2\sin \frac{x}{2}\right| \,dx \, \right] = - \log \left| 2\sin \frac{\theta}{2}\right| = \operatorname{Cl}_1(\theta)$$

== Relation to the inverse tangent integral ==
The inverse tangent integral is defined on the interval $0 < z < 1$ by

$$\operatorname{Ti}_2(z)=\int_0^z \frac{\tan^{-1}x}{x}\,dx = \sum_{k=0}^\infty (-1)^k \frac{z^{2k+1}}{(2k+1)^2}$$

It has the following closed form in terms of the Clausen function:

$$\operatorname{Ti}_2(\tan \theta)= \theta\log(\tan \theta) + \frac{1}{2} \operatorname{Cl}_2(2\theta) +\frac{1}{2}\operatorname{Cl}_2(\pi-2\theta)$$

=== Proof of the inverse tangent integral relation ===
From the integral definition of the inverse tangent integral, we have

$$\operatorname{Ti}_2(\tan \theta) = \int_0^{\tan \theta}\frac{\tan^{-1}x}{x}\,dx$$

Performing an integration by parts

$$\int_0^{\tan \theta} \frac{\tan^{-1}x}{x}\,dx= \tan^{-1}x\log x \, \Bigg|_0^{\tan \theta} - \int_0^{\tan \theta} \frac{\log x}{1+x^2}\,dx=$$
$$\theta \log \tan \theta - \int_0^{\tan \theta}\frac{\log x}{1+x^2}\,dx$$

Apply the substitution $x=\tan y,\, y=\tan^{-1}x,\, dy=\frac{dx}{1+x^2}\,$ to obtain

$$\theta \log \tan \theta - \int_0^\theta \log(\tan y)\,dy$$

For that last integral, apply the transform
$$y=x/2,\, dy=dx/2\,$$
to get

$$\begin{align}
& \theta \log \tan \theta - \frac 1 2 \int_0^{2\theta}\log\left(\tan \frac x 2 \right)\,dx \\[6pt]
= {} & \theta \log \tan \theta - \frac{1}{2}\int_0^{2\theta}\log\left(\frac{\sin (x/2) }{\cos (x/2)}\right)\,dx \\[6pt]
= {} & \theta \log \tan \theta - \frac{1}{2}\int_0^{2\theta}\log\left(\frac{2\sin (x/2) }{2\cos (x/2)}\right)\,dx \\[6pt]
= {} & \theta \log \tan \theta - \frac{1}{2}\int_0^{2\theta}\log\left(2\sin \frac{x}{2} \right)\,dx+ \frac{1}{2}\int_0^{2\theta}\log\left(2\cos \frac{x}{2}\right)\,dx \\[6pt]
= {} & \theta \log \tan \theta +\frac{1}{2}\operatorname{Cl}_2(2\theta)+ \frac{1}{2} \int_0^{2\theta} \log\left(2\cos \frac{x}{2}\right)\,dx.
\end{align}$$

Finally, as with the proof of the Duplication formula, the substitution $x=(\pi-y)\,$ reduces that last integral to

$$\int_0^{2\theta}\log\left(2\cos \frac{x}{2}\right)\,dx= \operatorname{Cl}_2(\pi-2\theta) - \operatorname{Cl}_2(\pi) = \operatorname{Cl}_2(\pi-2\theta)$$

Thus

$$\operatorname{Ti}_2(\tan \theta) = \theta \log \tan \theta +\frac{1}{2}\operatorname{Cl}_2(2\theta)+ \frac{1}{2} \operatorname{Cl}_2(\pi-2\theta)\, . \, \Box$$

== Relation to the Barnes' G-function ==
For real $0 < z < 1$, the Clausen function of second order can be expressed in terms of the Barnes G-function and (Euler) Gamma function:

$$\operatorname{Cl}_{2}(2\pi z) = 2\pi \log \left( \frac{G(1-z)}{G(1+z)} \right) +2\pi z \log \left( \frac{\pi}{ \sin \pi z } \right)$$

Or equivalently

$$\operatorname{Cl}_{2}(2\pi z) = 2\pi \log \left( \frac{G(1-z)}{G(z)} \right) -2\pi  \log \Gamma(z)+2\pi z \log \left( \frac{\pi}{ \sin \pi z } \right)$$

See Adamchik (2003).

== Relation to the polylogarithm ==
The Clausen functions represent the real and imaginary parts of the polylogarithm, on the unit circle:

$$\operatorname{Cl}_{2m}(\theta) = \Im (\operatorname{Li}_{2m}(e^{i \theta})), \quad m\in\Z \ge 1$$
$$\operatorname{Cl}_{2m+1}(\theta) = \Re (\operatorname{Li}_{2m+1}(e^{i \theta})), \quad m\in\Z \ge 0$$

This is easily seen by appealing to the series definition of the polylogarithm.

$$\operatorname{Li}_n(z)=\sum_{k=1}^\infty \frac{z^k}{k^n} \quad \Longrightarrow  \operatorname{Li}_n\left(e^{i\theta}\right)=\sum_{k=1}^\infty \frac{\left(e^{i\theta}\right)^k}{k^n}= \sum_{k=1}^\infty \frac{e^{ik\theta}}{k^n}$$

By Euler's theorem,

$$e^{i\theta} = \cos \theta +i\sin \theta$$

and by de Moivre's Theorem (De Moivre's formula)

$$(\cos \theta +i\sin \theta)^k= \cos k\theta +i\sin k\theta \quad \Rightarrow \operatorname{Li}_n\left(e^{i\theta}\right)=\sum_{k=1}^\infty \frac{\cos k\theta}{k^n}+ i \, \sum_{k=1}^\infty \frac{\sin k\theta}{k^n}$$

Hence

$$\operatorname{Li}_{2m}\left(e^{i\theta}\right)=\sum_{k=1}^\infty \frac{\cos k\theta}{k^{2m}}+ i \, \sum_{k=1}^\infty \frac{\sin k\theta}{k^{2m}} = \operatorname{Sl}_{2m}(\theta)+i\operatorname{Cl}_{2m}(\theta)$$
$$\operatorname{Li}_{2m+1}\left(e^{i\theta}\right)=\sum_{k=1}^\infty \frac{\cos k\theta}{k^{2m+1}}+ i \, \sum_{k=1}^\infty \frac{\sin k\theta}{k^{2m+1}} = \operatorname{Cl}_{2m+1}(\theta)+i\operatorname{Sl}_{2m+1}(\theta)$$

== Relation to the polygamma function ==
The Clausen functions are intimately connected to the polygamma function. Indeed, it is possible to express Clausen functions as linear combinations of sine functions and polygamma functions. One such relation is shown here, and proven below:

$$\operatorname{Cl}_{2m}\left( \frac{q\pi}{p}\right)= \frac{1}{(2p)^{2m}(2m-1)!} \, \sum_{j=1}^{p} \sin\left(\tfrac{qj\pi}{p}\right)\, \left[\psi_{2m-1}\left(\tfrac{j}{2p}\right)+(-1)^q\psi_{2m-1}\left(\tfrac{j+p}{2p}\right)\right].$$

An immediate corollary is this equivalent formula in terms of the Hurwitz zeta function:

$$\operatorname{Cl}_{2m}\left( \frac{q\pi}{p}\right)= \frac{1}{(2p)^{2m}} \, \sum_{j=1}^{p} \sin\left(\tfrac{qj\pi}{p}\right)\, \left[\zeta\left(2m,\tfrac{j}{2p}\right)+(-1)^q \zeta\left(2m,\tfrac{j+p}{2p}\right)\right].$$

Proof of the formula

Let $\,p\,$ and $\,q\,$ be positive integers, such that $\,q/p\,$ is a rational number $\,0 < q/p < 1\,$, then, by the series definition for the higher order Clausen function (of even index):

$$\operatorname{Cl}_{2m}\left( \frac{q\pi}{p}\right)= \sum_{k=1}^\infty \frac{\sin (kq\pi/p)}{k^{2m}}$$

We split this sum into exactly p-parts, so that the first series contains all, and only, those terms congruent to $\,kp+1,\,$ the second series contains all terms congruent to $\,kp+2,\,$ etc., up to the final p-th part, that contain all terms congruent to $\,kp+p\,$

$$\begin{align}
& \operatorname{Cl}_{2m}\left( \frac{q\pi}{p}\right) \\
= {} & \sum_{k=0}^\infty \frac{\sin \left[(kp+1)\frac{q\pi}{p}\right]}{(kp+1)^{2m}} + \sum_{k=0}^\infty \frac{\sin \left[(kp+2)\frac{q\pi}{p}\right]}{(kp+2)^{2m}} +
\sum_{k=0}^\infty \frac{\sin \left[(kp+3)\frac{q\pi}{p}\right]}{(kp+3)^{2m}} + \cdots \\
& \cdots + \sum_{k=0}^\infty \frac{\sin \left[(kp+p-2)\frac{q\pi}{p}\right]}{(kp+p-2)^{2m}} + \sum_{k=0}^\infty \frac{\sin \left[(kp+p-1)\frac{q\pi}{p}\right]}{(kp+p-1)^{2m}} +
\sum_{k=0}^\infty \frac{\sin \left[(kp+p)\frac{q\pi}{p}\right]}{(kp+p)^{2m}}
\end{align}$$

We can index these sums to form a double sum:

$$\begin{align}
& \operatorname{Cl}_{2m}\left( \frac{q\pi}{p}\right)= \sum_{j=1}^{p} \left\{ \sum_{k=0}^\infty \frac{\sin \left[(kp+j)\frac{q\pi}{p}\right]}{(kp+j)^{2m}} \right\} \\
= {} & \sum_{j=1}^{p} \frac{1}{p^{2m}}\left\{ \sum_{k=0}^\infty \frac{\sin \left[(kp+j)\frac{q\pi}{p}\right]}{(k+(j/p))^{2m}} \right\}
\end{align}$$

Applying the addition formula for the sine function, $\,\sin(x+y)=\sin x\cos y+\cos x\sin y,\,$ the sine term in the numerator becomes:

$$\sin \left[(kp+j)\frac{q\pi}{p}\right]=\sin\left(kq\pi+\frac{qj\pi}{p}\right)=\sin kq\pi \cos \frac{qj\pi}{p}+\cos kq\pi \sin\frac{qj\pi}{p}$$
$$\sin m\pi \equiv 0, \quad \, \cos m\pi \equiv (-1)^m \quad \Longleftrightarrow m=0,\, \pm 1,\, \pm 2,\, \pm 3,\, \ldots$$
$$\sin \left[(kp+j)\frac{q\pi}{p}\right]=(-1)^{kq}\sin\frac{qj\pi}{p}$$

Consequently,

$$\operatorname{Cl}_{2m}\left( \frac{q\pi}{p}\right)= \sum_{j=1}^p \frac{1}{p^{2m}} \sin\left(\frac{qj\pi}{p}\right)\, \left\{ \sum_{k=0}^\infty \frac{(-1)^{kq}}{(k+(j/p))^{2m}} \right\}$$

To convert the inner sum in the double sum into a non-alternating sum, split in two in parts in exactly the same way as the earlier sum was split into p-parts:

$$\begin{align}
& \sum_{k=0}^\infty \frac{(-1)^{kq}}{(k+(j/p))^{2m}}=\sum_{k=0}^\infty \frac{(-1)^{(2k)q}}{((2k)+(j/p))^{2m}}+ \sum_{k=0}^\infty \frac{(-1)^{(2k+1)q}}{((2k+1)+(j/p))^{2m}} \\
= {} & \sum_{k=0}^\infty \frac{1}{(2k+(j/p))^{2m}}+ (-1)^q\, \sum_{k=0}^\infty \frac{1}{(2k+1+(j/p))^{2m}} \\
= {} & \frac{1}{2^p}\left[ \sum_{k=0}^\infty \frac{1}{(k+(j/2p))^{2m}}+ (-1)^q\, \sum_{k=0}^\infty \frac{1}{(k+\left(\frac{j+p}{2p}\right))^{2m}} \right]
\end{align}$$

For $\,m \in\Z \ge 1\,$, the polygamma function has the series representation

$$\psi_m(z)=(-1)^{m+1}m! \sum_{k=0}^\infty \frac{1}{(k+z)^{m+1}}$$

So, in terms of the polygamma function, the previous inner sum becomes:

$$\frac{1}{2^{2m}(2m-1)!} \left[\psi_{2m-1}\left(\tfrac{j}{2p}\right)+(-1)^q\psi_{2m-1} \left(\tfrac{j+p}{2p}\right)\right]$$

Plugging this back into the double sum gives the desired result:

$$\operatorname{Cl}_{2m}\left( \frac{q\pi}{p}\right)= \frac{1}{(2p)^{2m}(2m-1)!} \, \sum_{j=1}^{p} \sin\left(\tfrac{qj\pi}{p}\right)\, \left[\psi_{2m-1}\left(\tfrac{j}{2p}\right)+(-1)^q\psi_{2m-1}\left(\tfrac{j+p}{2p}\right)\right]$$

== Relation to the generalized logsine integral ==
The generalized logsine integral is defined by:

$$\mathcal{L}s_n^{m}(\theta) = -\int_0^\theta  x^m \log^{n-m-1} \left| 2\sin\frac{x}{2} \right| \, dx$$

In this generalized notation, the Clausen function can be expressed in the form:

$$\operatorname{Cl}_2(\theta) = \mathcal{L}s_2^{0}(\theta)$$

== Kummer's relation ==
Ernst Kummer and Rogers give the relation

$$\operatorname{Li}_2(e^{i \theta}) = \zeta(2) - \theta(2\pi-\theta)/4 + i\operatorname{Cl}_2(\theta)$$

valid for $0\leq \theta \leq 2\pi$.

== Relation to the Lobachevsky function ==
The Lobachevsky function Λ or Л is essentially the same function with a change of variable:

$$\Lambda(\theta) = - \int_0^\theta \log|2 \sin(t)| \,dt = \operatorname{Cl}_2(2\theta)/2$$

though the name "Lobachevsky function" is not quite historically accurate, as Lobachevsky's formulas for hyperbolic volume used the slightly different function

$$\int_0^\theta \log| \sec(t)| \,dt = \Lambda(\theta+\pi/2)+\theta\log 2.$$

== Relation to Dirichlet L-functions ==
For rational values of $\theta/\pi$ (that is, for $\theta/\pi=p/q$ for some integers p and q), the function $\sin(n\theta)$ can be understood to represent a periodic orbit of an element in the cyclic group, and thus $\operatorname{Cl}_s(\theta)$ can be expressed as a simple sum involving the Hurwitz zeta function. This allows relations between certain Dirichlet L-functions to be easily computed.

== Series acceleration ==
A series acceleration for the Clausen function is given by

$$\frac{\operatorname{Cl}_2(\theta)} \theta =
1-\log|\theta| + \sum_{n=1}^\infty \frac{\zeta(2n)}{n(2n+1)} \left(\frac \theta {2\pi}\right)^{2n}$$

which holds for $|\theta|<2\pi$. Here, $\zeta(s)$ is the Riemann zeta function. A more rapidly convergent form is given by

$$\frac{\operatorname{Cl}_2(\theta)}{\theta} =
3-\log\left[|\theta| \left(1-\frac{\theta^2}{4\pi^2}\right)\right]
-\frac{2\pi}{\theta} \log \left( \frac{2\pi+\theta}{2\pi-\theta}\right)
+\sum_{n=1}^\infty \frac{\zeta(2n)-1}{n(2n+1)} \left(\frac{\theta}{2\pi}\right)^{2n}.$$

Convergence is aided by the fact that $\zeta(n)-1$ approaches zero rapidly for large values of n. Both forms are obtainable through the types of resummation techniques used to obtain rational zeta series (Borwein et al. 2000).

== Special values ==
Recall the Barnes G-function, the Catalan's constant K and the Gieseking constant V. Some special values include

$$\operatorname{Cl}_2\left(\frac{\pi}{2}\right)=K$$
$$\operatorname{Cl}_2\left(\frac{\pi}{3}\right)=V$$
$$\operatorname{Cl}_2\left(\frac{\pi}{3}\right)=3\pi \log\left(
\frac{G\left(\frac{2}{3}\right)}{ G\left(\frac{1}{3}\right)} \right)-3\pi \log
\Gamma\left(\frac{1}{3}\right)+\pi \log \left(\frac{ 2\pi }{\sqrt{3}}\right)$$
$$\operatorname{Cl}_2\left(\frac{2\pi}{3}\right)=2\pi \log\left(
\frac{G\left(\frac{2}{3}\right)}{ G\left(\frac{1}{3}\right)} \right)-2\pi \log
\Gamma\left(\frac{1}{3}\right) +\frac{2\pi}{3} \log \left(\frac{ 2\pi
}{\sqrt{3}}\right)$$
$$\operatorname{Cl}_2\left(\frac{\pi}{4}\right)=
2\pi\log \left( \frac{G\left(\frac{7}{8}\right)}{G\left(\frac{1}{8}\right)} \right) -2\pi
\log \Gamma\left(\frac{1}{8}\right)+\frac{\pi}{4}\log \left( \frac{2\pi}{\sqrt{2-\sqrt{2}}}
\right)$$
$$\operatorname{Cl}_2\left(\frac{3\pi}{4}\right)=
2\pi\log \left( \frac{G\left(\frac{5}{8}\right)}{G\left(\frac{3}{8}\right)} \right) -2\pi
\log \Gamma\left(\frac{3}{8}\right)+\frac{3\pi}{4}\log \left( \frac{2\pi}{\sqrt{2+\sqrt{2}}}
\right)$$
$$\operatorname{Cl}_2\left(\frac{\pi}{6}\right)=
2\pi\log \left( \frac{G\left(\frac{11}{12}\right)}{G\left(\frac{1}{12}\right)} \right) -2\pi
\log \Gamma\left(\frac{1}{12}\right)+\frac{\pi}{6}\log \left( \frac{2\pi \sqrt{2}
}{\sqrt{3}-1} \right)$$
$$\operatorname{Cl}_2\left(\frac{5\pi}{6}\right)=
2\pi\log \left( \frac{G\left(\frac{7}{12}\right)}{G\left(\frac{5}{12}\right)} \right) -2\pi
\log \Gamma\left(\frac{5}{12}\right)+\frac{5\pi}{6}\log \left( \frac{2\pi \sqrt{2}
}{\sqrt{3}+1} \right)$$

In general, from the Barnes G-function reflection formula,

$$\operatorname{Cl}_2(2\pi z)=2\pi\log\left( \frac{G(1-z)}{G(z)} \right)-2\pi\log\Gamma(z)+2\pi z\log\left(\frac{\pi}{\sin\pi z}\right)$$

Equivalently, using Euler's reflection formula for the gamma function, then,

$$\operatorname{Cl}_2(2\pi z)=2\pi\log\left( \frac{G(1-z)}{G(z)} \right)-2\pi\log\Gamma(z)+2\pi z\log\big(\Gamma(z)\Gamma(1 - z)\big)$$

== Generalized special values ==
Some special values for higher order Clausen functions include

$$\operatorname{Cl}_{2m}(0)=\operatorname{Cl}_{2m}(\pi) = \operatorname{Cl}_{2m}(2\pi)=0$$
$$\operatorname{Cl}_{2m}\left(\frac{\pi}{2}\right)=\beta(2m)$$
$$\operatorname{Cl}_{2m+1}(0)=\operatorname{Cl}_{2m+1}(2\pi)=\zeta(2m+1)$$
$$\operatorname{Cl}_{2m+1}(\pi)=-\eta(2m+1)=-\left(\frac{2^{2m}-1}{2^{2m}}\right) \zeta(2m+1)$$
$$\operatorname{Cl}_{2m+1}\left(\frac{\pi}{2}\right)=-\frac{1}{2^{2m+1}}\eta(2m+1)=-\left(\frac{2^{2m}-1}{2^{4m+1}}\right)\zeta(2m+1)$$

where $\beta(x)$ is the Dirichlet beta function, $\eta(x)$ is the Dirichlet eta function (also called the alternating zeta function), and $\zeta(x)$ is the Riemann zeta function.

== Integrals of the direct function ==
The following integrals are easily proven from the series representations of the Clausen function:

$$\int_0^\theta \operatorname{Cl}_{2m}(x)\,dx=\zeta(2m+1)-\operatorname{Cl}_{2m+1}(\theta)$$
$$\int_0^\theta \operatorname{Cl}_{2m+1}(x)\,dx=\operatorname{Cl}_{2m+2}(\theta)$$
$$\int_0^\theta \operatorname{Sl}_{2m}(x)\,dx=\operatorname{Sl}_{2m+1}(\theta)$$
$$\int_0^\theta \operatorname{Sl}_{2m+1}(x)\,dx=\zeta(2m+2)-\operatorname{Sl}_{2m+2}(\theta)$$

Fourier-analytic methods can be used to find the first moments of the square of the function $\operatorname{Cl}_2(x)$ on the interval $[0,\pi]$:

$$\int_0^\pi \operatorname{Cl}_2^2(x)\,dx=\zeta(4),$$
$$\int_0^\pi t\operatorname{Cl}_2^2(x)\,dx=\frac{221}{90720} \pi^{6}-4 \zeta(\overline{5}, 1)-2 \zeta(\overline{4}, 2),$$
$$\int_0^\pi t^2\operatorname{Cl}_2^2(x)\,dx=-\frac{2}{3} \pi\left[12 \zeta(\overline{5}, 1)+6 \zeta(\overline{4}, 2)-\frac{23}{10080} \pi^{6}\right].$$

Here $\zeta$ denotes the multiple zeta function.

== Integral evaluations involving the direct function ==
A large number of trigonometric and logarithmo-trigonometric integrals can be evaluated in terms of the Clausen function, and various common mathematical constants like $\, K \,$ (Catalan's constant), $\, \log 2 \,$, and the special cases of the zeta function, $\, \zeta(2) \,$ and $\, \zeta(3) \,$.

The examples listed below follow directly from the integral representation of the Clausen function, and the proofs require little more than basic trigonometry, integration by parts, and occasional term-by-term integration of the Fourier series definitions of the Clausen functions.

$$\int_0^\theta \log(\sin x)\,dx=-\tfrac{1}{2}\operatorname{Cl}_2(2\theta)-\theta\log 2$$
$$\int_0^\theta \log(\cos x)\,dx=\tfrac{1}{2}\operatorname{Cl}_2(\pi-2\theta)-\theta\log 2$$
$$\int_0^\theta \log(\tan x)\,dx=-\tfrac{1}{2}\operatorname{Cl}_2(2\theta)-\tfrac{1}{2} \operatorname{Cl}_2(\pi-2\theta)$$
$$\int_0^\theta \log(1+\cos x)\,dx=2\operatorname{Cl}_2(\pi-\theta)-\theta\log 2$$
$$\int_0^\theta \log(1-\cos x)\,dx=-2\operatorname{Cl}_2(\theta)-\theta\log 2$$
$$\int_0^\theta \log(1+\sin x)\,dx=2K-2\operatorname{Cl}_2\left(\frac{\pi}{2}+\theta\right) -\theta\log 2$$
$$\int_0^\theta \log(1-\sin x)\,dx=-2K+2\operatorname{Cl}_2\left(\frac{\pi}{2}-\theta\right)-\theta\log 2$$
