= TI2 =

TI2 may refer to:

- The International 2012, a Dota 2 tournament
- Twilight Imperium: Second Edition, a 2000 board game

== See also ==
- Inverse tangent integral, denoted Ti_{2}
