= Catalan's constant =

Number, approximately 0.916

- Rationality: Unknown
- Symbol: G

Representations
- Decimal: 0.9159655941772190150...

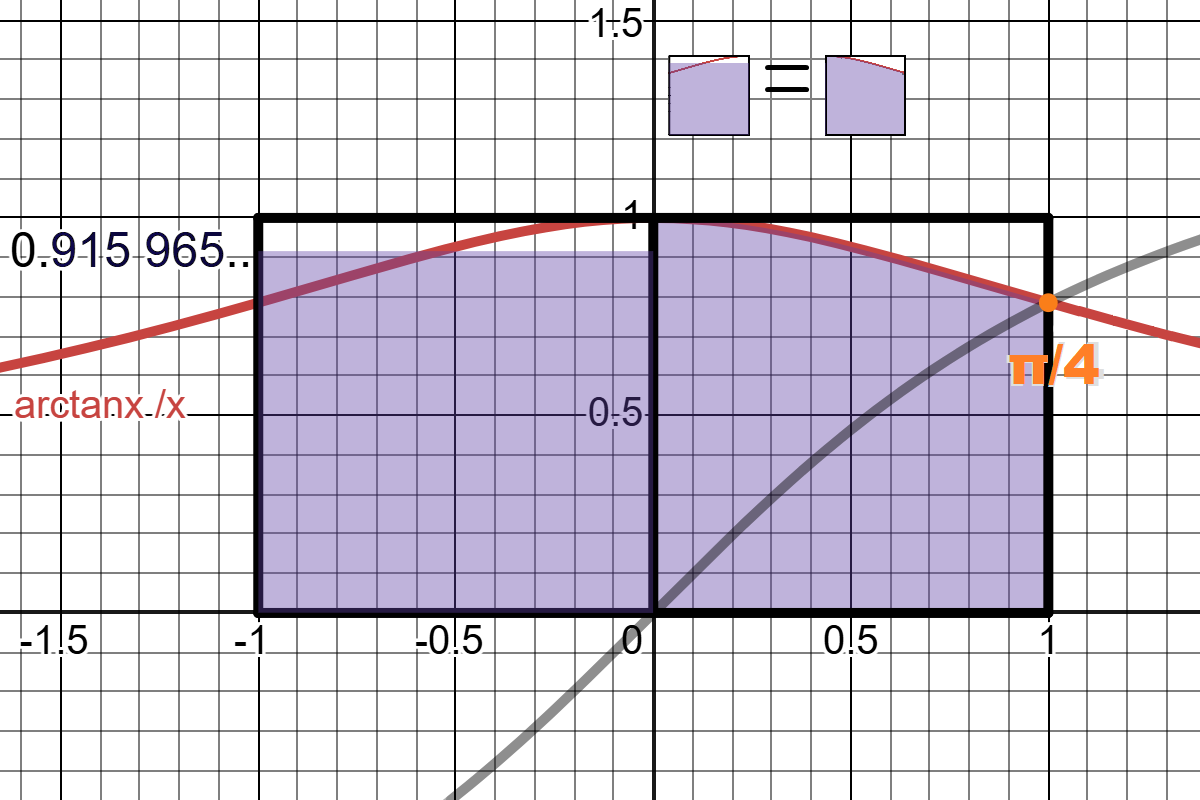
Catalan constant as area under the curve of arctan(x)/x

In mathematics, Catalan's constant G is the alternating sum of the reciprocals of the odd square numbers:
$$G = \sum_{n=0}^\infty \frac{(-1)^{n}}{(2n + 1)^2} =
\frac{1}{1^2} - \frac{1}{3^2} + \frac{1}{5^2} - \frac{1}{7^2} + \frac{1}{9^2} - \cdots.$$
Its numerical value is approximately (sequence A006752 in the OEIS)

G = 0.915965594177219015054603514932384110774...,

and it is also equal to β(2), where β is the Dirichlet beta function.

Catalan's constant was named after Eugène Charles Catalan, who found quickly-converging series for its calculation and published a memoir on it in 1865.

== Uses ==
In low-dimensional topology, Catalan's constant is 1/4 of the volume of an ideal hyperbolic octahedron, and therefore 1/4 of the hyperbolic volume of the complement of the Whitehead link. It is 1/8 of the volume of the complement of the Borromean rings.

In combinatorics and statistical mechanics, it arises in connection with counting domino tilings, spanning trees, and Hamiltonian cycles of grid graphs.

In number theory, Catalan's constant appears in a conjectured formula for the asymptotic number of primes of the form $n^2+1$ according to Hardy and Littlewood's Conjecture F. However, it is an unsolved problem (one of Landau's problems) whether there are even infinitely many primes of this form.

Catalan's constant also appears in the calculation of the mass distribution of spiral galaxies.

== Properties ==
Unsolved problem in mathematics
Is Catalan's constant irrational? If so, is it transcendental?
More unsolved problems in mathematics

It is not known whether G is irrational, let alone transcendental. G has been called "arguably the most basic constant whose irrationality and transcendence (though strongly suspected) remain unproven".

OpenAI has released a preprint with the title "Catalan's constant is irrational", which the company claims is a proof of irrationality.

However, partial results exist. It is known that infinitely many of the numbers β(2n) are irrational, where β(s) is the Dirichlet beta function. In particular, at least one of β(2), β(4), β(6), β(8), β(10) and β(12) must be irrational, where β(2) is Catalan's constant. These results by Wadim Zudilin and Tanguy Rivoal are related to similar ones given for the odd zeta constants ζ(2n + 1).

Catalan's constant is known to be an algebraic period, which follows from some of the double integrals given below.

== Series representations ==
Catalan's constant appears in the evaluation of several rational series including:
$$\frac{\pi^2}{16}+\frac G2 = \sum_{n=0}^\infty \frac{1}{(4n+1)^2}.$$
$$\frac{\pi^2}{16}-\frac G2 = \sum_{n=0}^\infty \frac{1}{(4n+3)^2}.$$
The following two formulas involve quickly converging series, and are thus appropriate for numerical computation:
$$\begin{align}
G & = 3 \sum_{n=0}^\infty \frac{1}{2^{4n}}
\left(-\frac{1}{2(8n+2)^2}+\frac{1}{2^2(8n+3)^2}-\frac{1}{2^3(8n+5)^2}+\frac{1}{2^3(8n+6)^2}-\frac{1}{2^4(8n+7)^2}+\frac{1}{2(8n+1)^2}\right) \\
& \qquad -2 \sum_{n=0}^\infty \frac{1}{2^{12n}}
\left(\frac{1}{2^4(8n+2)^2}+\frac{1}{2^6(8n+3)^2}-\frac{1}{2^9(8n+5)^2}-\frac{1}{2^{10} (8n+6)^2}-\frac{1}{2^{12} (8n+7)^2}+\frac{1}{2^3(8n+1)^2}\right)
\end{align}$$
and
$$G = \frac{\pi}{8}\log\left(2 + \sqrt{3}\right) + \frac{3}{8}\sum_{n=0}^\infty \frac{1}{(2n+1)^2 \binom{2n}{n}}.$$

The theoretical foundations for such series are given by Broadhurst, for the first formula, and Ramanujan, for the second formula. The algorithms for fast evaluation of the Catalan constant were constructed by E. Karatsuba. Using these series, calculating Catalan's constant is now about as fast as calculating Apéry's constant, $\zeta(3)$.

Other quickly converging series, due to Guillera and Pilehrood and employed by the y-cruncher software, include:

$$G = \frac{1}{2}\sum_{k=0}^{\infty }\frac{(-8)^{k}(3k+2)}{(2k+1)^{3}{\binom{2k}{k}}^{3}}$$

$$G = \frac{1}{64}\sum_{k=1}^{\infty }\frac{256^{k}(580k^2-184k+15)}{k^3(2k-1)\binom{6k}{3k}\binom{6k}{4k}\binom{4k}{2k}}$$

$$G = -\frac{1}{1024}\sum_{k=1}^{\infty }\frac{(-4096)^k(45136k^4-57184k^3+21240k^2-3160k+165)}{k^3(2k-1)^3}\left( \frac{(2k)!^6(3k)!^3}{k!^3(6k)!^3} \right)$$

All of these series have time complexity $O(n\log(n)^3)$.

== Integral identities ==
As Seán Stewart writes: "There is a rich and seemingly endless source of definite integrals that can be equated to or expressed in terms of Catalan's constant." Some of these expressions include:
$$\begin{align}
G &= -\frac{1}{\pi i} \int_0^{\pi/2} \ln\ln\tan x \ln\tan x \,dx, \\
G &= \iint_{[0,1]^2} \frac{1}{1 + x^2 y^2} \,dx\,dy, \\
G &= \int_0^1 \int_0^{1-x} \frac{1}{1 - x^2 - y^2} \,dy\,dx, \\
G &= \int_1^\infty \frac{\ln t}{1 + t^2} \,dt, \\
G &= -\int_0^1 \frac{\ln t}{1 + t^2} \,dt, \\
G &= \frac{1}{2} \int_0^{\pi/2} \frac{t}{\sin t} \,dt, \\
G &= \int_0^{\pi/4} \ln\cot t \,dt, \\
G &= \frac{1}{2} \int_0^{\pi/2} \ln(\sec t + \tan t) \,dt, \\
G &= \int_0^1 \frac{\arccos t}{\sqrt{1 + t^2}} \,dt, \\
G &= \int_0^1 \frac{\operatorname{arcsinh} t}{\sqrt{1 - t^2}} \,dt, \\
G &= \frac{1}{2} \int_0^\infty \frac{\operatorname{arctan} t}{t \sqrt{1 + t^2}} \,dt, \\
G &= \frac{1}{2} \int_0^1 \frac{\operatorname{arctanh} t}{\sqrt{1 - t^2}} \,dt, \\
G &= \int_0^\infty \arccot e^t \,dt, \\
G &= \frac{1}{4} \int_0^{\pi^2/4} \csc \sqrt{t} \,dt, \\
G &= \frac{1}{16} \left(\pi^2 + 4 \int_1^\infty \arccsc^2 t \,dt\right), \\
G &= \frac{1}{2} \int_0^\infty \frac{t}{\cosh t} \,dt,  \\
G &= \frac{\pi}{2} \int_1^\infty \frac{(t^4 - 6t^2 + 1) \ln\ln t}{(1 + t^2)^3} \,dt, \\
G &= \frac{1}{2} \int_0^\infty \frac{\arcsin(\sin t)}{t} \,dt, \\
G &= 1 + \lim_{\alpha \to 1^-} \left\{
\int_0^\alpha \frac{(1 + 6t^2 + t^4) \arctan t}{t(1 - t^2)^2} \,dt +
2\operatorname{artanh}\alpha - \frac{\pi\alpha}{1 - \alpha^2}
\right\}, \\
G &= 1 - \frac18 \iint_{\R^2} \frac{x \sin(2xy/\pi)}{(x^2 + \pi^2) \cosh x \sinh y} \,dx\,dy, \\
G &= \int_0^\infty \int_0^\infty \frac{\sqrt[4]{x} \left(\sqrt{x} \sqrt{y} - 1\right)}{(x + 1)^2 \sqrt[4]{y} (y + 1)^2 \log (x y)} \,dx\,dy,
\end{align}$$
where the last three formulas are related to Malmsten's integrals.

If K(k) is the complete elliptic integral of the first kind, as a function of the elliptic modulus k, then
$$G = \frac{1}{2} \int_0^1 \mathrm{K}(k)\,dk.$$

If E(k) is the complete elliptic integral of the second kind, as a function of the elliptic modulus k, then
$$G = -\frac{1}{2} + \int_0^1 \mathrm{E}(k)\,dk.$$

With the gamma function Γ(x + 1) = x!, Catalan's constant is
$$\begin{align}
G &= \frac{\pi}{4} \int_0^1 \Gamma\left(1 + \frac{x}{2}\right) \Gamma\left(1 - \frac{x}{2}\right) \,dx \\
&= \frac{\pi}{2} \int_0^{1/2} \Gamma(1 + y) \Gamma(1 - y) \,dy.
\end{align}$$

The integral
$$G = \operatorname{Ti}_2(1) = \int_0^1 \frac{\arctan t}{t} \,dt$$
is a known special function, called the inverse tangent integral, and was extensively studied by Srinivasa Ramanujan.

== Relation to special functions ==
G appears in values of the second polygamma function, also called the trigamma function, at fractional arguments:
$$\begin{align}
\psi_1 \left(\tfrac14\right) &= \pi^2 + 8G, \\
\psi_1 \left(\tfrac34\right) &= \pi^2 - 8G.
\end{align}$$

Simon Plouffe gives an infinite collection of identities between the trigamma function, π^{2} and Catalan's constant; these are expressible as paths on a graph (see § External links below).

Catalan's constant occurs frequently in relation to the Clausen function, the inverse tangent integral, the inverse sine integral, the Barnes G-function, as well as integrals and series summable in terms of the aforementioned functions.

As a particular example, by first expressing the inverse tangent integral in its closed form – in terms of Clausen functions – and then expressing those Clausen functions in terms of the Barnes G-function, the following expression is obtained (see Clausen function for more):
$$G = 4\pi \log\frac{G\left(\frac{3}{8}\right) G\left(\frac{7}{8}\right)}
{G\left(\frac{1}{8}\right) G\left(\frac{5}{8}\right)} +
4\pi \log\frac{\Gamma\left(\frac{3}{8}\right)}
{\Gamma\left(\frac{1}{8}\right)} +
\frac{\pi}{2} \log\frac{1 + \sqrt{2}}{2\left(2 - \sqrt{2}\right)}.$$

If one defines the Lerch transcendent Φ(z, s, α) by
$$\Phi(z, s, \alpha) = \sum_{n=0}^\infty \frac{z^n}{(n + \alpha)^s},$$
then
$$G = \frac{1}{4} \Phi\left(-1, 2, \tfrac{1}{2}\right).$$
This comes directly from the fact that $\beta(s) = 2^{-s} \Phi\left(-1, s, \tfrac{1}{2}\right)$ and $\beta(2) = G$, where $\beta(s)$ is the Dirichlet beta function

== Continued fraction ==
G can be expressed in the following form:
$$G = \cfrac{1}{1 + \cfrac{1^4}{8 + \cfrac{3^4}{16 + \cfrac{5^4}{24 + \cfrac{7^4}{32 + \cfrac{9^4}{40 + \ddots}}}}}}.$$
The simple continued fraction is given by
$$G = \cfrac{1}{1 + \cfrac{1}{10 + \cfrac{1}{1 + \cfrac{1}{8 + \cfrac{1}{1 + \cfrac{1}{88 + \ddots}}}}}}.$$
This continued fraction would have infinite terms if and only if $G$ is irrational, which is still unresolved.

The following continued fraction representation gives (asymptotically) 2.08 new correct decimal places per cycle:
$$G = \frac{\frac{13}{2}}{Z_0}, \quad Z_k = a(k) + \frac{b(k)}{Z_{k+1}}$$
with
$$\begin{align}
a(k) &= 3520k^6 + 5632k^5 + 2064k^4 - 384k^3 - 156k^2 + 16k + 7, \\
b(k) &= (2k + 1)^4 (2k + 2)^4 (20k^2 - 8k + 1) (20k^2 + 72k + 65).
\end{align}$$

== Known digits ==
The number of known digits of Catalan's constant G has increased dramatically during the last decades. This is due both to the increase of performance of computers as well as to algorithmic improvements.

Number of known decimal digits of Catalan's constant G
Date	Decimal digits	Computation performed by
1832	16	Thomas Clausen
1858	19	Carl Johan Danielsson Hill
1864	14	Eugène Charles Catalan
1877	20	James W. L. Glaisher
1913	32	James W. L. Glaisher
1990	20000	Greg J. Fee
1996	50000	Greg J. Fee
August 14, 1996	100000	Greg J. Fee & Simon Plouffe
September 29, 1996	300000	Thomas Papanikolaou
1996	1500000	Thomas Papanikolaou
1997	3379957	Patrick Demichel
January 4, 1998	12500000	Xavier Gourdon
2001	100000500	Xavier Gourdon & Pascal Sebah
2002	201000000	Xavier Gourdon & Pascal Sebah
October 2006	5000000000	Shigeru Kondo & Steve Pagliarulo
August 2008	10000000000	Shigeru Kondo & Steve Pagliarulo
January 31, 2009	15510000000	Alexander J. Yee & Raymond Chan
April 16, 2009	31026000000	Alexander J. Yee & Raymond Chan
June 7, 2015	200000001100	Robert J. Setti
April 12, 2016	250000000000	Ron Watkins
February 16, 2019	300000000000	Tizian Hanselmann
March 29, 2019	500000000000	Mike A & Ian Cutress
July 16, 2019	600000000100	Seungmin Kim
September 6, 2020	1000000001337	Andrew Sun
March 9, 2022	1200000000100	Seungmin Kim

== See also ==
- Gieseking manifold
- List of mathematical constants
- Mathematical constant
- Particular values of Riemann zeta function
