= Gieseking manifold =

In mathematics, the Gieseking manifold is a cusped hyperbolic 3-manifold of finite volume, discovered by Hugo Gieseking. It is non-orientable and has the smallest volume among non-compact hyperbolic manifolds, having volume approximately $V \approx 1.0149416$.

The Gieseking manifold can be constructed by removing the vertices from a tetrahedron, then gluing the faces together in pairs using affine-linear maps. Label the vertices 0, 1, 2, 3. Glue the face with vertices 0, 1, 2 to the face with vertices 3, 1, 0 in that order. Glue the face 0, 2, 3 to the face 3, 2, 1 in that order. In the hyperbolic structure of the Gieseking manifold, this ideal tetrahedron is the canonical polyhedral decomposition of David B. A. Epstein and Robert C. Penner. Moreover, the angle made by the faces is $\pi/3$. The triangulation has one tetrahedron, two faces, one edge and no vertices, so all the edges of the original tetrahedron are glued together.

The Gieseking manifold has a double cover homeomorphic to the figure-eight knot complement. The underlying compact manifold has a Klein bottle boundary, and the first homology group of the Gieseking manifold is the integers.

The Gieseking manifold is a fiber bundle over the circle with fiber the once-punctured torus and monodromy given by $(x,y) \to (x+y,x).$ The square of this map is Arnold's cat map and this gives another way to see that the Gieseking manifold is double covered by the complement of the figure-eight knot.

== Gieseking constant ==
The volume of the Gieseking manifold is called the Gieseking constant and has a numeral value of

$V = \operatorname{Cl}_2\left(\frac{\pi}{3}\right) = 1.01494 \ 16064 \ 09653 \ 62502 \ 12025 \dots$ (sequence A143298 in the OEIS)

where $\operatorname{Cl}_2$ is the Clausen function. This is similar to Catalan's constant $G$, which also manifests as a volume and can be expressed in terms of the Clausen function:

$$G=\operatorname{Cl}_2\left(\frac{\pi}{2}\right) = 0.91596559\dots$$

There is a related expression in terms of a special value of a Dirichlet L-function given by the identity

$$V = \frac{3 \sqrt{3}}{4} \cdot L(2,\chi_{-3}) = \frac{3 \sqrt{3}}{4} \bigg(\sum_{k=0}^\infty \frac{1}{(3k+1)^2} - \frac{1}{(3k+2)^2}\bigg),$$

whereas Catalan's constant is equal to $L(2,\chi_{-4})$. It follows that

$$\sum_{k=0}^\infty \frac{1}{(3k+1)^2}=\frac{2\pi^2}{27}+\frac{2\sqrt3}{9}V,$$

$$\sum_{k=0}^\infty \frac{1}{(3k+2)^2}=\frac{2\pi^2}{27}-\frac{2\sqrt3}{9}V.$$

Catalan's constant satisfies similar equations:

$$\sum_{k=0}^\infty \frac{1}{(4k+1)^2}=\frac{\pi^2}{16}+\frac{1}{2}G,$$

$$\sum_{k=0}^\infty \frac{1}{(4k+3)^2}=\frac{\pi^2}{16}-\frac{1}{2}G.$$

Another closed form expression may be given in terms of the trigamma function:

$$V = \frac{\sqrt 3}{3}\left(\frac{\psi_1(1/3)}{2}-\frac{\pi^2}{3}\right).$$

Integrals for the Gieseking constant are given by

$$V = \int_{0}^{2\pi/3} \ln\left(2\cos\left(\tfrac12x\right)\right)\mathrm dx = 2\int_0^1 \frac{\ln(1+x)}{\sqrt{(1-x)(3+x)}}\mathrm dx$$

which follow from its definition with the Clausen function and

$$V =\frac{\sqrt{3}}2 \int_0^\infty\int_0^\infty\int_0^\infty \frac{\mathrm{d}x \ \mathrm{d}y \ \mathrm dz}{xyz (x+y+z+\tfrac1x+\tfrac1y+\tfrac1z)^2}.$$

In 2024, Frank Calegari, Vesselin Dimitrov, and Yunqing Tang proved that $1, \pi^2, L(2,\chi_{-3})$ are linearly independent over the rationals. This proves that $\sqrt{3} \cdot V$ is irrational as well as the special values $\psi_1(1/6)$, $\psi_1(1/3)$, $\psi_1(2/3)$, $\psi_1(5/6)$ of the trigamma function. The irrationality of $V$ itself is still open.

== See also ==
- List of mathematical constants
- Catalan's constant
