= Trigamma function =

Mathematical function

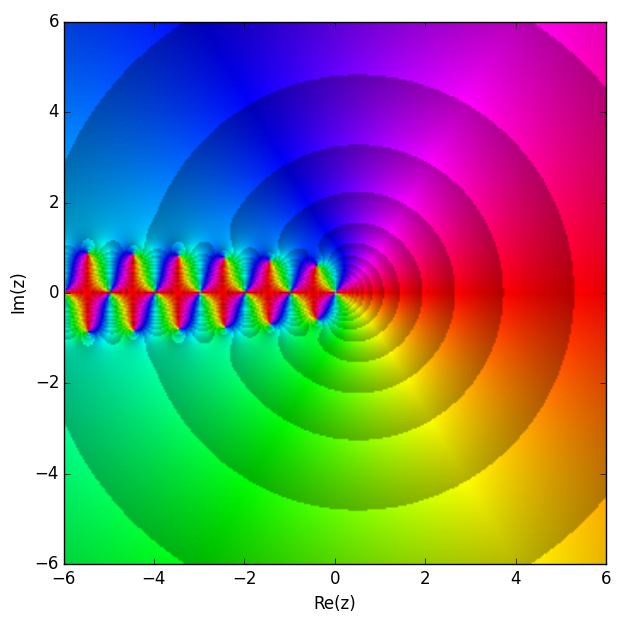
Color representation of the trigamma function, ψ_{1}(z), in a rectangular region of the complex plane. It is generated using the domain coloring method.

In mathematics, the trigamma function, denoted ψ_{1}(z) or ψ^{(1)}(z), is the second of the polygamma functions, and is defined by

$$\psi_1(z) = \frac{d^2}{dz^2} \ln\Gamma(z)$$.

It follows from this definition that

$$\psi_1(z) = \frac{d}{dz} \psi(z)$$

where ψ(z) is the digamma function. It may also be defined as the sum of the series

$$\psi_1(z) = \sum_{n = 0}^{\infty}\frac{1}{(z + n)^2},$$

making it a special case of the Hurwitz zeta function

$$\psi_1(z) = \zeta(2,z).$$

Note that the last two formulas are valid when 1 − z is not a natural number.

== Calculation ==
A double integral representation, as an alternative to the ones given above, may be derived from the series representation:

$$\psi_1(z) = \int_0^1\!\!\int_0^x\frac{x^{z-1}}{y(1 - x)}\,dy\,dx$$

using the formula for the sum of a geometric series. Integration over y yields:

$$\psi_1(z) = -\int_0^1\frac{x^{z-1}\ln{x}}{1-x}\,dx$$

An asymptotic expansion as a Laurent series can be obtained via the derivative of the asymptotic expansion of the digamma function:

$$\begin{align}
\psi_1(z)
&\sim {\operatorname{d}\over\operatorname{d}\!z} \left(\ln z - \sum_{n=1}^\infty \frac{B_n}{nz^n}\right) \\
&= \frac{1}{z} + \sum_{n=1}^\infty \frac{B_n}{z^{n+1}} = \sum_{n=0}^{\infty}\frac{B_n}{z^{n+1}} \\
&= \frac{1}{z} + \frac{1}{2z^2} + \frac{1}{6z^3} - \frac{1}{30z^5} + \frac{1}{42z^7} - \frac{1}{30z^9} + \frac{5}{66z^{11}} - \frac{691}{2730z^{13}} + \frac{7}{6z^{15}} \cdots
\end{align}$$

where B_{n} is the nth Bernoulli number and we choose B_{1} = 1/2.

=== Recurrence and reflection formulae ===
The trigamma function satisfies the recurrence relation

$$\psi_1(z + 1) = \psi_1(z) - \frac{1}{z^2}$$

and the reflection formula

$$\psi_1(1 - z) + \psi_1(z) = \frac{\pi^2}{\sin^2 \pi z} \,$$

which immediately gives the value for z = 1/2: $\psi_1(\tfrac{1}{2})=\tfrac{\pi^2}{2}$.

=== Special values ===
At positive integer values we have that

$$\psi_1(n) = \frac{\pi^2}{6} - \sum_{k=1}^{n-1} \frac{1}{k^2}, \qquad \psi_1(1) = \frac{\pi^2}{6}, \qquad \psi_1(2) = \frac{\pi^2}{6} - 1, \qquad \psi_1(3) = \frac{\pi^2}{6} - \frac{5}{4}.$$

At positive half integer values we have that

$$\psi_1\left(n+\frac12\right)=\frac{\pi^2}{2}-4\sum_{k=1}^n\frac{1}{(2k-1)^2},
\qquad \psi_1\left(\tfrac12\right) = \frac{\pi^2}{2},
\qquad \psi_1\left(\tfrac32\right) = \frac{\pi^2}{2} - 4 .$$

The trigamma function has other special values such as:

$$\psi_1\left(\tfrac14\right) = \pi^2 + 8G$$

where G represents Catalan's constant.

There are no roots on the real axis of ψ_{1}, but there exist infinitely many pairs of roots z_{n}, z̅_{n̅} for Re z < 0. Each such pair of roots approaches Re z_{n} = −n + 1/2 quickly and their imaginary part increases slowly logarithmic with n. For example, z_{1} = −0.4121345... + 0.5978119...i and z_{2} = −1.4455692... + 0.6992608...i are the first two roots with Im(z) > 0.

=== Relation to the Clausen function ===
The digamma function at rational arguments can be expressed in terms of trigonometric functions and logarithm by the digamma theorem. A similar result holds for the trigamma function but the circular functions are replaced by Clausen's function. Namely,

$$\psi_1\left(\frac{p}{q}\right)=\frac{\pi^2}{2\sin^2(\pi p/q)}+2q\sum_{m=1}^{(q-1)/2}\sin\left(\frac{2\pi mp}{q}\right)\textrm{Cl}_2\left(\frac{2\pi m}{q}\right).$$

== Appearance ==
The trigamma function appears in this sum formula:

$$\sum_{n=1}^\infty\frac{n^2-\frac12}{\left(n^2+\frac12\right)^2}\left(\psi_1\bigg(n-\frac{i}{\sqrt{2}}\bigg)+\psi_1\bigg(n+\frac{i}{\sqrt{2}}\bigg)\right)=
-1+\frac{\sqrt{2}}{4}\pi\coth\frac{\pi}{\sqrt{2}}-\frac{3\pi^2}{4\sinh^2\frac{\pi}{\sqrt{2}}}+\frac{\pi^4}{12\sinh^4\frac{\pi}{\sqrt{2}}}\left(5+\cosh\pi\sqrt{2}\right).$$

== See also ==
- Gamma function
- Digamma function
- Polygamma function
- Catalan's constant
