= Dirichlet beta function =

Special mathematical function

The Dirichlet beta function

In mathematics, the Dirichlet beta function (also known as the Catalan beta function) is a special function, closely related to the Riemann zeta function. It is a particular Dirichlet L-function, the L-function for the alternating character of period four.

== Definition ==
The Dirichlet beta function is defined as

$$\beta(s) = \sum_{n=0}^\infty \frac{(-1)^n} {(2n+1)^s},$$

or, equivalently,

$$\beta(s) = \frac{1}{\Gamma(s)}\int_0^{\infty}\frac{x^{s-1}e^{-x}}{1 + e^{-2x}}\,dx.$$

In each case, it is assumed that Re(s) > 0.

Alternatively, the following definition, in terms of the Hurwitz zeta function, is valid in the whole complex s-plane:

$$\beta(s) = 4^{-s} \left( \zeta\left(s,{1 \over 4}\right)-\zeta\left( s, {3 \over 4}\right) \right).$$

Another equivalent definition, in terms of the Lerch transcendent, is:

$$\beta(s) = 2^{-s} \Phi\left(-1,s,{{1} \over {2}}\right),$$

which is once again valid for all complex values of s.

The Dirichlet beta function can also be written in terms of the polylogarithm function:

$$\beta(s) = \frac{i}{2} \left(\text{Li}_s(-i)-\text{Li}_s(i)\right).$$

Also the series representation of Dirichlet beta function can be formed in terms of the polygamma function

$$\beta(s) =\frac{1}{2^s} \sum_{n=0}^\infty\frac{(-1)^{n}}{\left(n+\frac{1}{2}\right)^{s}}=\frac1{(-4)^s(s-1)!}\left[\psi^{(s-1)}\left(\frac{1}{4}\right)-\psi^{(s-1)}\left(\frac{3}{4}\right)\right]$$

but this formula is only valid at positive integer values of $s$.

== Euler product formula ==
It is also the simplest example of a series non-directly related to $\zeta(s)$ which can also be factorized as an Euler product, thus leading to the idea of Dirichlet character defining the exact set of Dirichlet series having a factorization over the prime numbers.

At least for Re(s) ≥ 1:

$$\beta(s) = \prod_{p \equiv 1 \ \mathrm{mod} \ 4} \frac{1}{1 - p^{-s}} \prod_{p \equiv 3 \ \mathrm{mod} \ 4} \frac{1}{1 + p^{-s}}$$

where p≡1 mod 4 are the primes of the form 4n+1 (5,13,17,...) and p≡3 mod 4 are the primes of the form 4n+3 (3,7,11,...). This can be written compactly as

$$\beta(s) = \prod_{p>2\atop p \text{ prime}} \frac{1}{1 -\, \scriptstyle(-1)^{\frac{p-1}{2}} \textstyle p^{-s}}.$$

== Functional equation ==
The functional equation extends the beta function to the left side of the complex plane Re(s) ≤ 0. It is given by

$$\beta(1-s)=\left(\frac{\pi}{2}\right)^{-s}\sin\left(\frac{\pi}{2}s\right)\Gamma(s)\beta(s)$$

where $\Gamma(s)$ is the gamma function. It was conjectured by Euler in 1749 and proved by Malmsten in 1842.

== Specific values ==
=== Positive integers ===
For every odd positive integer $2n+1$, the following equation holds:

$$\beta(2n+1)\;=\;\frac{(-1)^n E_{2n}}{2(2n)!}\left(\frac\pi2\right)^{2n+1}$$

where $E_n$ is the n-th Euler Number. This yields:

$$\beta(1)\;=\;\frac{\pi}{4},$$
$$\beta(3)\;=\;\frac{\pi^3}{32},$$
$$\beta(5)\;=\;\frac{5\pi^5}{1536},$$
$$\beta(7)\;=\;\frac{61\pi^7}{184320}$$

For the values of the Dirichlet beta function at even positive integers no elementary closed form is known, and no method has yet been found for determining the arithmetic nature of even beta values (similarly to the Riemann zeta function at odd integers greater than 3). The number $\beta(2)=G$ is known as Catalan's constant.

It has been proven that infinitely many numbers of the form $\beta(2n)$ and at least one of the numbers $\beta(2), \beta(4), \beta(6), ..., \beta(12)$ are irrational.

The even beta values may be given in terms of the polygamma functions and the Bernoulli numbers:

$$\beta(2n)=\frac{\psi^{(2n-1)}(1/4)}{4^{2n-1}(2n)!}n - \frac{\pi^{2n}(2^{2n}-1)|B_{2n}|}{2(2n)!}$$

We can also express the beta function for positive $n$ in terms of the inverse tangent integral:

$$\beta(n)=\text{Ti}_n(1)$$
$$\beta(1)=\arctan(1)$$

For every positive integer k:

$$\beta(2k)=\frac{1}{2(2k-1)!}\sum_{m=0}^\infty\left(\left(\sum_{l=0}^{k-1}\binom{2k-1}{2l}\frac{(-1)^{l}A_{2k-2l-1}}{2l+2m+1}\right)-\frac{(-1)^{k-1}}{2m+2k}\right)\frac{A_{2m}}{(2m)!}{\left(\frac{\pi}{2}\right)}^{2m+2k},$$

where $A_{k}$ is the Euler zigzag number.

| s | approximate value β(s) | OEIS |
|---|---|---|
| 1 | 0.7853981633974483096156608 | A003881 |
| 2 | 0.9159655941772190150546035 | A006752 |
| 3 | 0.9689461462593693804836348 | A153071 |
| 4 | 0.9889445517411053361084226 | A175572 |
| 5 | 0.9961578280770880640063194 | A175571 |
| 6 | 0.9986852222184381354416008 | A175570 |
| 7 | 0.9995545078905399094963465 | A258814 |
| 8 | 0.9998499902468296563380671 | A258815 |
| 9 | 0.9999496841872200898213589 | A258816 |

=== Negative integers ===
For negative odd integers, the function is zero:

$$\beta(-2n-1)\;=\;0$$

For every negative even integer it holds:

$$\beta(-2n)\;=\;\frac12E_{2n}$$.

It further is:

$$\beta(0)\;=\; \frac{1}{2}$$.

=== Derivative ===
We have:

$\beta'(-1)=\frac{2G}\pi$

$\beta'(0)=2\ln\Gamma(\tfrac14)-\ln\pi-\tfrac32\ln2=\ln\tfrac\varpi{\sqrt\pi}$

$\beta'(1)=\tfrac\pi4(\gamma+2\ln2+3\ln\pi-4\ln\Gamma(\tfrac14))=\tfrac\pi4(\gamma-\ln2+2\ln\tfrac\pi\varpi)$

with $\gamma$ being Euler's constant, $\varpi$ being the Lemniscate constant and $G$ being Catalan's constant. The last identity was derived by Malmsten in 1842.

== See also ==
- Hurwitz zeta function
- Dirichlet eta function
- Polylogarithm
