= Rational zeta series =

In mathematics, a rational zeta series is the representation of an arbitrary real number in terms of a series consisting of rational numbers and the Riemann zeta function or the Hurwitz zeta function. Specifically, given a real number x, the rational zeta series for x is given by

$$x=\sum_{n=2}^\infty q_n \zeta (n,m)$$

where each q_{n} is a rational number, the value m is held fixed, and ζ(s, m) is the Hurwitz zeta function. It is not hard to show that any real number x can be expanded in this way.

== Elementary series ==
For integer m>1, one has

$$x=\sum_{n=2}^\infty q_n \left[\zeta(n)- \sum_{k=1}^{m-1} k^{-n}\right]$$

For m=2, a number of interesting numbers have a simple expression as rational zeta series:

$$1=\sum_{n=2}^\infty \left[\zeta(n)-1\right]$$

and

$$1-\gamma=\sum_{n=2}^\infty \frac{1}{n}\left[\zeta(n)-1\right]$$

where γ is the Euler–Mascheroni constant. The series

$$\log 2 =\sum_{n=1}^\infty \frac{1}{n}\left[\zeta(2n)-1\right]$$

follows by summing the Gauss–Kuzmin distribution. There are also series for π:

$$\log \pi =\sum_{n=2}^\infty \frac{2(3/2)^n-3}{n}\left[\zeta(n)-1\right]$$

and

$$\frac{13}{30} - \frac{\pi}{8} =\sum_{n=1}^\infty \frac{1}{4^{2n}}\left[\zeta(2n)-1\right]$$

being notable because of its fast convergence. This last series follows from the general identity

$$\sum_{n=1}^\infty (-1)^{n} t^{2n} \left[\zeta(2n)-1\right] =
\frac{t^2}{1+t^2} + \frac{1-\pi t}{2} - \frac {\pi t}{e^{2\pi t} -1}$$

which in turn follows from the generating function for the Bernoulli numbers

$$\frac{t}{e^t-1} = \sum_{n=0}^\infty B_n \frac{t^n}{n!}$$

Adamchik and Srivastava give a similar series

$$\sum_{n=1}^\infty \frac{t^{2n}}{n} \zeta(2n) =
\log \left(\frac{\pi t} {\sin (\pi t)}\right)$$

== Polygamma-related series ==
A number of additional relationships can be derived from the Taylor series for the polygamma function at z = 1, which is

$$\psi^{(m)}(z+1)= \sum_{k=0}^\infty
(-1)^{m+k+1} (m+k)!\; \zeta (m+k+1)\; \frac {z^k}{k!}$$.

The above converges for |z| < 1. A special case is

$$\sum_{n=2}^\infty t^n \left[\zeta(n)-1\right] =
-t\left[\gamma +\psi(1-t) -\frac{t}{1-t}\right]$$

which holds for |t| < 2. Here, ψ is the digamma function and ψ^{(m)} is the polygamma function. Many series involving the binomial coefficient may be derived:

$$\sum_{k=0}^\infty {k+\nu+1 \choose k} \left[\zeta(k+\nu+2)-1\right]
= \zeta(\nu+2)$$

where ν is a complex number. The above follows from the series expansion for the Hurwitz zeta

$$\zeta(s,x+y) =
\sum_{k=0}^\infty {s+k-1 \choose s-1} (-y)^k \zeta (s+k,x)$$

taken at y = −1. Similar series may be obtained by simple algebra:

$$\sum_{k=0}^\infty {k+\nu+1 \choose k+1} \left[\zeta(k+\nu+2)-1\right]
= 1$$

and

$$\sum_{k=0}^\infty (-1)^k {k+\nu+1 \choose k+1} \left[\zeta(k+\nu+2)-1\right]
= 2^{-(\nu+1)}$$

and

$$\sum_{k=0}^\infty (-1)^k {k+\nu+1 \choose k+2} \left[\zeta(k+\nu+2)-1\right]
= \nu \left[\zeta(\nu+1)-1\right] -  2^{-\nu}$$

and

$$\sum_{k=0}^\infty (-1)^k {k+\nu+1 \choose k} \left[\zeta(k+\nu+2)-1\right]
= \zeta(\nu+2)-1 -  2^{-(\nu+2)}$$

For integer n ≥ 0, the series

$$S_n = \sum_{k=0}^\infty {k+n \choose k} \left[\zeta(k+n+2)-1\right]$$

can be written as the finite sum

$$S_n=(-1)^n\left[1+\sum_{k=1}^n \zeta(k+1) \right]$$

The above follows from the simple recursion relation S_{n} + S_{n + 1} = ζ(n + 2). Next, the series

$$T_n = \sum_{k=0}^\infty {k+n-1 \choose k} \left[\zeta(k+n+2)-1\right]$$

may be written as

$$T_n=(-1)^{n+1}\left[n+1-\zeta(2)+\sum_{k=1}^{n-1} (-1)^k (n-k) \zeta(k+1) \right]$$

for integer n ≥ 1. The above follows from the identity T_{n} + T_{n + 1} = S_{n}. This process may be applied recursively to obtain finite series for general expressions of the form

$$\sum_{k=0}^\infty {k+n-m \choose k} \left[\zeta(k+n+2)-1\right]$$

for positive integers m.

== Half-integer power series ==
Similar series may be obtained by exploring the Hurwitz zeta function at half-integer values. Thus, for example, one has

$$\sum_{k=0}^\infty \frac {\zeta(k+n+2)-1}{2^k}
{{n+k+1} \choose {n+1}}=\left(2^{n+2}-1\right)\left(\zeta(n+2)-1\right)-1$$

== Expressions in the form of p-series ==
Adamchik and Srivastava give

$$\sum_{n=2}^\infty n^m \left[\zeta(n)-1\right] =
1\, +
\sum_{k=1}^m k!\; S(m+1,k+1) \zeta(k+1)$$

and

$$\sum_{n=2}^\infty (-1)^n n^m \left[\zeta(n)-1\right] =
-1\, +\, \frac {1-2^{m+1}}{m+1} B_{m+1}
\,- \sum_{k=1}^m (-1)^k k!\; S(m+1,k+1) \zeta(k+1)$$

where $B_k$ are the Bernoulli numbers and $S(m,k)$ are the Stirling numbers of the second kind.

== Other series ==
Other constants that have notable rational zeta series are:

- Khinchin's constant
- Apéry's constant
