= Reflection formula =

Numerical computation of special functions

In mathematics, a reflection formula or reflection relation for a function f is a relationship between f(a − x) and f(x). It is a special case of a functional equation. It is common in mathematical literature to use the term "functional equation" for what are specifically reflection formulae.

Reflection formulae are useful for numerical computation of special functions. In effect, an approximation that has greater accuracy or only converges on one side of a reflection point (typically in the positive half of the complex plane) can be employed for all arguments.

== Known formulae ==
The even and odd functions satisfy by definition simple reflection relations around a = 0. For all even functions,

$$f(-x) = f(x),$$

and for all odd functions,

$$f(-x) = -f(x).$$

A famous relationship is Euler's reflection formula

$$\Gamma(z)\Gamma(1-z) = \frac{\pi}{\sin{(\pi z)}}, \qquad z \not\in \mathbb Z$$

for the gamma function $\Gamma(z)$, due to Leonhard Euler.

There is also a reflection formula for the general n-th order polygamma function ψ^{(n)}(z),

$$\psi^{(n)} (1-z)+(-1)^{n+1}\psi^{(n)} (z) = (-1)^n \pi \frac{d^n}{d z^n} \cot{(\pi z)}$$

which springs trivially from the fact that the polygamma functions are defined as the derivatives of $\ln \Gamma$ and thus inherit the reflection formula.

The dilogarithm also satisfies a reflection formula,

$$\operatorname{Li}_2(z)+\operatorname{Li}_2(1-z)=\zeta(2)-\ln (z)\ln(1-z)$$

The Riemann zeta function ζ(z) satisfies

$$\frac{\zeta(1-z)}{\zeta(z)} = \frac{2\, \Gamma(z)}{(2\pi)^{z}} \cos\left(\frac{\pi z}{2}\right),$$

and the Riemann Xi function ξ(z) satisfies

$$\xi(z) = \xi(1-z).$$
