= Inverse tangent integral =

Special function related to the dilogarithm

The inverse tangent integral is a special function, defined by:

$$\operatorname{Ti}_2(x) = \int_0^x \frac{\arctan t}{t} \, dt$$

Equivalently, it can be defined by a power series, or in terms of the dilogarithm, a closely related special function.

== Definition ==
The inverse tangent integral is defined by:

$$\operatorname{Ti}_2(x) = \int_0^x \frac{\arctan t}{t} \, dt$$

The arctangent is taken to be the principal branch; that is, −π/2 < arctan(t) < π/2 for all real t.

Its power series representation is

$$\operatorname{Ti}_2(x) = x - \frac{x^3}{3^2} + \frac{x^5}{5^2} - \frac{x^7}{7^2} + \cdots$$

which is absolutely convergent for $|x| \le 1.$

The inverse tangent integral is closely related to the dilogarithm $\operatorname{Li}_2(z) = \sum_{n=1}^\infty \frac{z^n}{n^2}$ and can be expressed simply in terms of it:

$$\operatorname{Ti}_2(z) = \frac{1}{2i} \left( \operatorname{Li}_2(iz) - \operatorname{Li}_2(-iz) \right)$$

That is,

$$\operatorname{Ti}_2(x) = \operatorname{Im}(\operatorname{Li}_2(ix))$$

for all real x.

== Properties ==
The inverse tangent integral is an odd function:

$$\operatorname{Ti}_2(-x) = -\operatorname{Ti}_2(x)$$

The values of Ti_{2}(x) and Ti_{2}(1/x) are related by the identity

$$\operatorname{Ti}_2(x) - \operatorname{Ti}_2 \left(\frac{1}{x} \right) = \frac{\pi}{2} \log x$$

valid for all x > 0 (or, more generally, for Re(x) > 0). This can be proven by differentiating and using the identity $\arctan(t) + \arctan(1/t) = \pi/2$.

The special value Ti_{2}(1) is Catalan's constant $1 - \frac{1}{3^2} + \frac{1}{5^2} - \frac{1}{7^2} + \cdots \approx 0.915966$.

== Integral relations ==
$$\int_0^{\pi/2}\operatorname{arcsinh}(r\sin\theta)\,\mathrm d\theta=\operatorname{Ti}_2(r),\quad |r|\le1$$

$$\int_0^{\pi/2}\operatorname{arctanh}(r\sin\theta)\,\mathrm d\theta=2\operatorname{Ti}_2\left(\frac{1-\sqrt{1-r^2}}{r}\right),\quad |r|\le1\setminus\{0\}$$

$$\int_0^{\pi/2}\operatorname{arctanh}(p\sin\theta)\arctan(q\sin\theta)\,\mathrm d\theta=\pi\operatorname{Ti}_2\left(\frac{1-\sqrt{1-p^2}}{p}\cdot\frac{\sqrt{1+q^2}-1}{q}\right),\quad |p|\le1\setminus\{0\},q\ne0$$

$$\int_0^{\alpha}\!\!\int_0^{\beta}\frac{\mathrm dx\,\mathrm dy}{1+x^2y^2}=\operatorname{Ti}_2(\alpha\beta),\quad |\alpha\beta|\le1$$

== Generalizations ==
Similar to the polylogarithm $\operatorname{Li}_n(z) = \sum_{k=1}^\infty \frac{z^k}{k^n}$, the function

$$\operatorname{Ti}_{n}(x) = \sum\limits_{k=0}^{\infty}\frac{(-1)^{k}x^{2k+1}}{\left(2k+1\right)^{n}}=x - \frac{x^3}{3^n} + \frac{x^5}{5^n} - \frac{x^7}{7^n} + \cdots$$

is defined analogously. This satisfies the recurrence relation:

$$\operatorname{Ti}_{n}(x) = \int_0^x \frac{\operatorname{Ti}_{n-1}(t)}{t} \, dt$$

By this series representation it can be seen that the special values $\operatorname{Ti}_{n}(1)=\beta(n)$, where $\beta(s)$ represents the Dirichlet beta function.

== Relation to other special functions ==
The inverse tangent integral is related to the Legendre chi function $\chi_2(x) = x + \frac{x^3}{3^2} + \frac{x^5}{5^2} + \cdots$ by:

$$\operatorname{Ti}_2(x) = -i \chi_2(ix)$$

Note that $\chi_2(x)$ can be expressed as $\int_0^x \frac{\operatorname{artanh} t}{t} \, dt$, similar to the inverse tangent integral but with the inverse hyperbolic tangent instead.

The inverse tangent integral can also be written in terms of the Lerch transcendent $\Phi(z,s,a) = \sum_{n=0}^\infty \frac{z^n}{(n+a)^s}:$

$$\operatorname{Ti}_2(x) = \frac{1}{4} x \Phi(-x^2, 2, 1/2)$$

== History ==
The notation Ti_{2} and Ti_{n} is due to Lewin. Spence (1809) studied the function, using the notation $\overset{n}{\operatorname{C}}(x)$. The function was also studied by Ramanujan.
