= Polygamma function =

Meromorphic function

Graphs of the polygamma functions ψ, ψ^{(1)}, ψ^{(2)} and ψ^{(3)} of real arguments

Plot of the digamma function, the first polygamma function, in the complex plane from −2−2i to 2+2i with colors created by Mathematica's function ComplexPlot3D showing one cycle of phase shift around each pole and the zero

In mathematics, the polygamma function of order m is a meromorphic function on the complex numbers $\mathbb{C}$ defined as the (m + 1)th derivative of the logarithm of the gamma function:

$$\psi^{(m)}(z) := \frac{\mathrm{d}^m}{\mathrm{d}z^m} \psi(z) = \frac{\mathrm{d}^{m+1}}{\mathrm{d}z^{m+1}} \ln\Gamma(z).$$

Thus

$$\psi^{(0)}(z) = \psi(z) = \frac{\Gamma'(z)}{\Gamma(z)}$$

holds where ψ(z) is the digamma function and Γ(z) is the gamma function. They are holomorphic on $\mathbb{C} \backslash\mathbb{Z}_{\le0}$. At all the nonpositive integers these polygamma functions have a pole of order m + 1. The function ψ^{(1)}(z) is sometimes called the trigamma function.

The logarithm of the gamma function and the first few polygamma functions in the complex plane

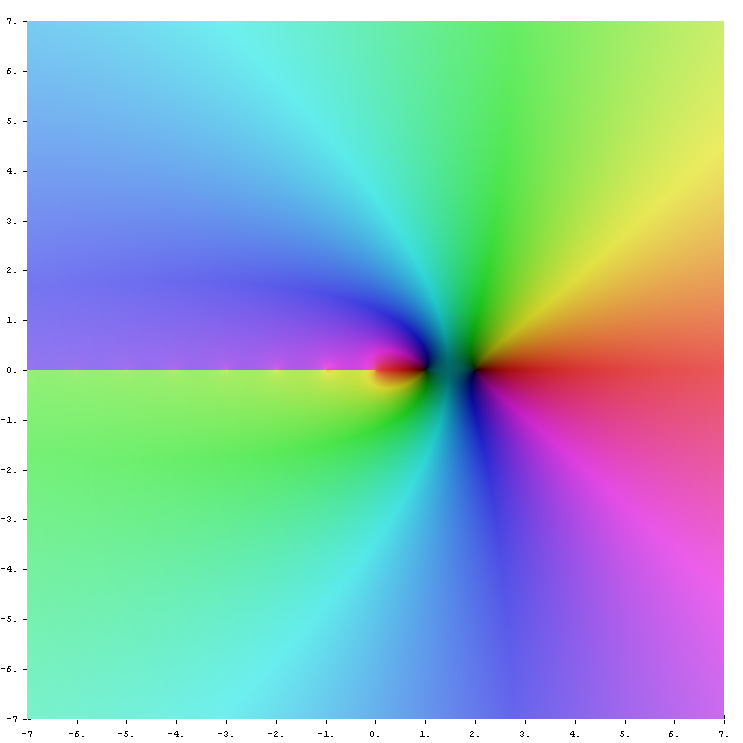

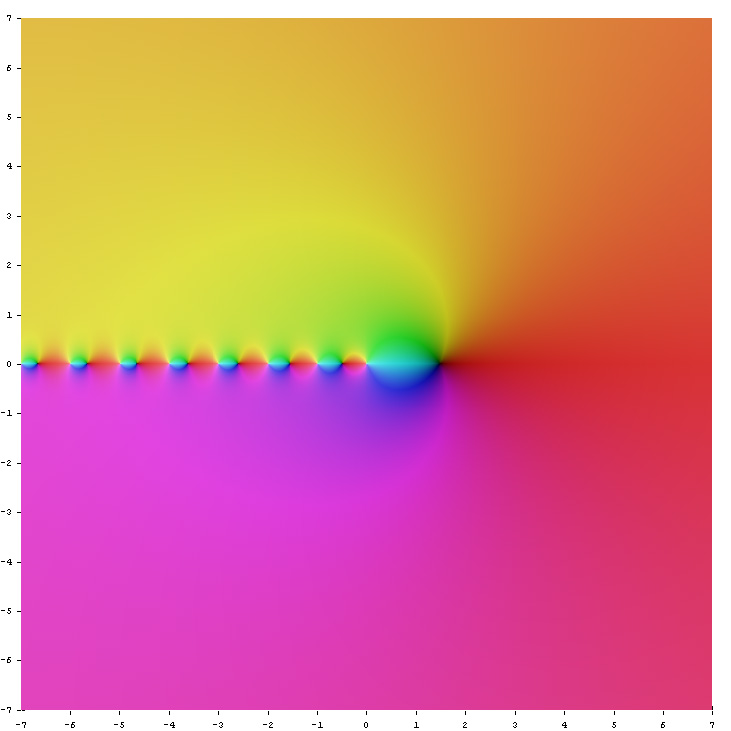

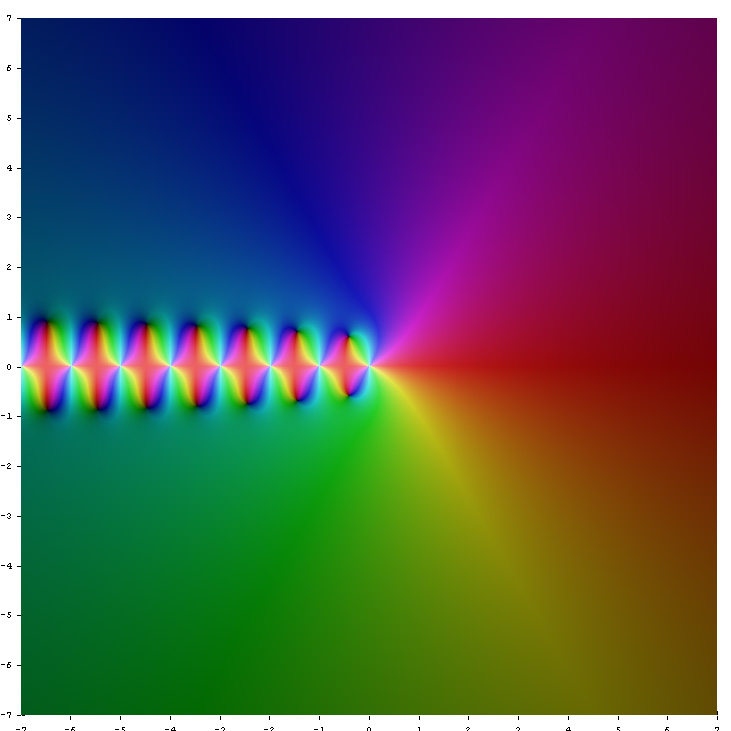

ln Γ(z)
ψ^{(0)}(z)
ψ^{(1)}(z)

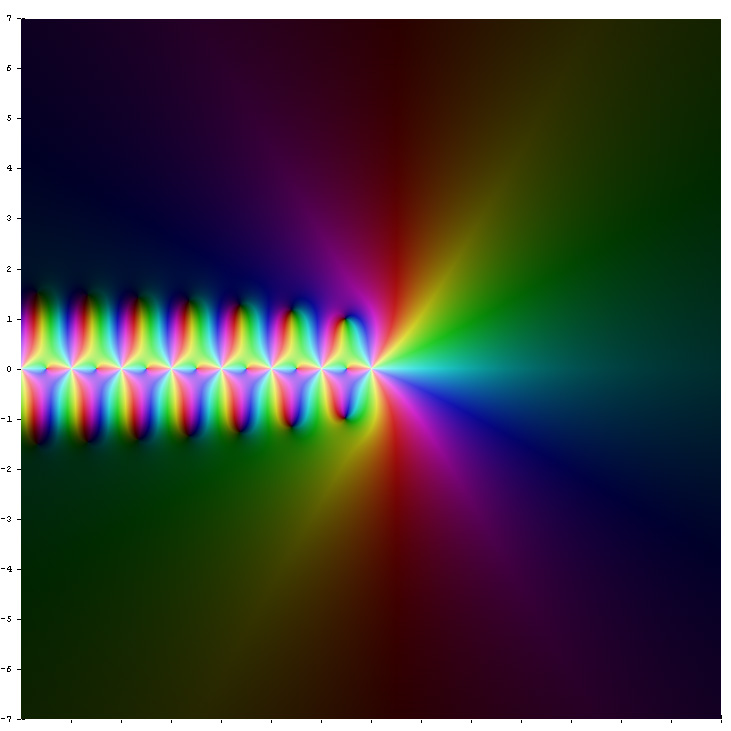

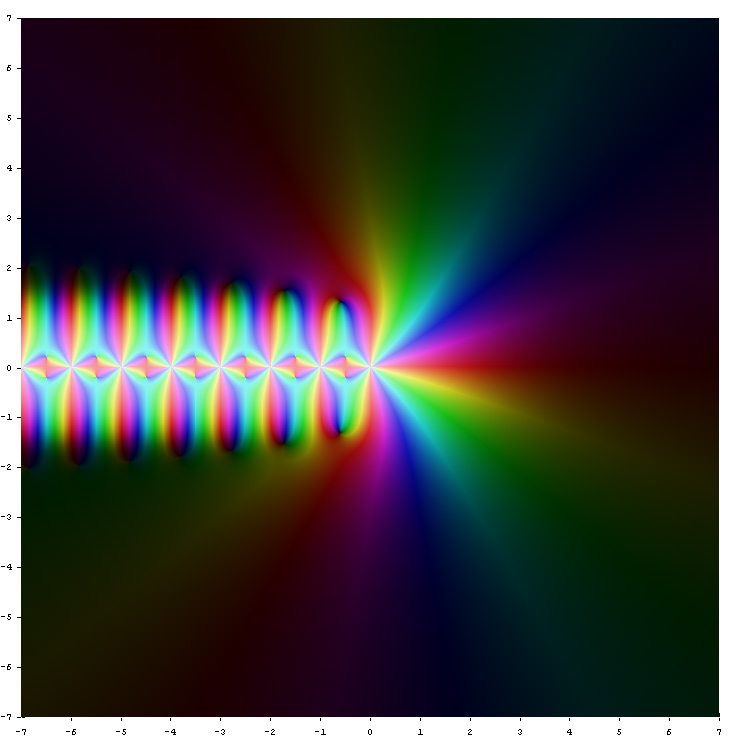

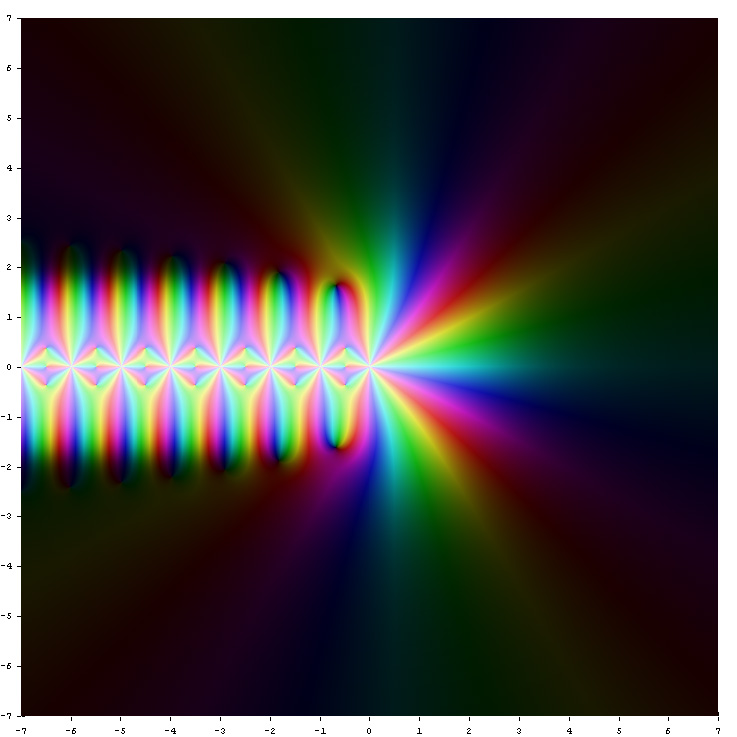

ψ^{(2)}(z)
ψ^{(3)}(z)
ψ^{(4)}(z)

== Integral representation ==
When m > 0 and Re z > 0, the polygamma function equals

$$\begin{align}
\psi^{(m)}(z)
&= (-1)^{m+1}\int_0^\infty \frac{t^m e^{-zt}}{1-e^{-t}}\,\mathrm{d}t \\
&= -\int_0^1 \frac{t^{z-1}}{1-t}(\ln t)^m\,\mathrm{d}t\\
&= (-1)^{m+1}m!\zeta(m+1,z)
\end{align}$$

where $\zeta(s,q)$ is the Hurwitz zeta function.

This expresses the polygamma function as the Laplace transform of ((−1)^{m+1} t^{m})/(1 − e^{−t}). It follows from Bernstein's theorem on monotone functions that, for m > 0 and x real and non-negative, (−1)^{m+1} ψ^{(m)}(x) is a completely monotone function.

Setting m = 0 in the above formula does not give an integral representation of the digamma function. The digamma function has an integral representation, due to Gauss, which is similar to the m = 0 case above but which has an extra term (e^{−t})/t.

== Recurrence relation ==
It satisfies the recurrence relation

$$\psi^{(m)}(z+1)= \psi^{(m)}(z) + \frac{(-1)^m\,m!}{z^{m+1}}$$

which – considered for positive integer argument – leads to a presentation of the sum of reciprocals of the powers of the natural numbers:

$$\frac{\psi^{(m)}(n)}{(-1)^{m+1}\,m!} = \zeta(1+m) - \sum_{k=1}^{n-1} \frac{1}{k^{m+1}} = \sum_{k=n}^\infty \frac{1}{k^{m+1}} \qquad m \ge 1$$

and

$$\psi^{(0)}(n) = -\gamma\ + \sum_{k=1}^{n-1}\frac{1}{k}$$

for all $n \in \mathbb{N}$, where $\gamma$ is the Euler–Mascheroni constant. Like the log-gamma function, the polygamma functions can be generalized from the domain $\mathbb{N}$ uniquely to positive real numbers only due to their recurrence relation and one given function-value, say ψ^{(m)}(1), except in the case m = 0 where the additional condition of strict monotonicity on $\mathbb{R}^{+}$ is still needed. This is a trivial consequence of the Bohr–Mollerup theorem for the gamma function where strictly logarithmic convexity on $\mathbb{R}^{+}$ is demanded additionally. The case m = 0 must be treated differently because ψ^{(0)} is not normalizable at infinity (the sum of the reciprocals doesn't converge).

== Reflection relation ==
$$(-1)^m \psi^{(m)} (1-z) - \psi^{(m)} (z) = \pi \frac{\mathrm{d}^m}{\mathrm{d} z^m} \cot{\pi z} = \pi^{m+1} \frac{P_m(\cos{\pi z})}{\sin^{m+1}(\pi z)}$$

where P_{m} is alternately an odd or even polynomial of degree |m − 1| with integer coefficients and leading coefficient (−1)^{m}⌈2^{m − 1}⌉. They obey the recursion equation

$$\begin{align} P_0(x) &= x \\ P_{m+1}(x) &= - \left( (m+1)xP_m(x)+\left(1-x^2\right)P'_m(x)\right).\end{align}$$

== Multiplication theorem ==
The multiplication theorem gives

$$k^{m+1} \psi^{(m)}(kz) = \sum_{n=0}^{k-1} \psi^{(m)}\left(z+\frac{n}{k}\right)\qquad m \ge 1$$

and

$$k \psi^{(0)}(kz) = k\ln{k} + \sum_{n=0}^{k-1}
\psi^{(0)}\left(z+\frac{n}{k}\right)$$

for the digamma function.

== Series representation ==
The polygamma function has the series representation

$$\psi^{(m)}(z) = (-1)^{m+1}\, m! \sum_{k=0}^\infty \frac{1}{(z+k)^{m+1}}$$

which holds for integer values of m > 0 and any complex z not equal to a negative integer. This representation can be written more compactly in terms of the Hurwitz zeta function as

$$\psi^{(m)}(z) = (-1)^{m+1}\, m!\, \zeta (m+1,z).$$

This relation can for example be used to compute the special values

$$\psi^{(2n-1)}\left(\frac14\right) = \frac{4^{2n-1}}{2n}\left(\pi^{2n}(2^{2n}-1)|B_{2n}|+2(2n)!\beta(2n)\right);$$
$$\psi^{(2n-1)}\left(\frac34\right) = \frac{4^{2n-1}}{2n}\left(\pi^{2n}(2^{2n}-1)|B_{2n}|-2(2n)!\beta(2n)\right);$$
$$\psi^{(2n)}\left(\frac14\right) = -2^{2n-1}\left(\pi^{2n+1}|E_{2n}|+2(2n)!(2^{2n+1}-1)\zeta(2n+1)\right);$$
$$\psi^{(2n)}\left(\frac34\right) = 2^{2n-1}\left(\pi^{2n+1}|E_{2n}|-2(2n)!(2^{2n+1}-1)\zeta(2n+1)\right).$$

Alternately, the Hurwitz zeta can be understood to generalize the polygamma to arbitrary, non-integer order.

One more series may be permitted for the polygamma functions. As given by Schlömilch,

$$\frac{1}{\Gamma(z)} = z e^{\gamma z}  \prod_{n=1}^\infty \left(1 + \frac{z}{n}\right) e^{-\frac{z}{n}}.$$

This is a result of the Weierstrass factorization theorem. Thus, the gamma function may now be defined as:

$$\Gamma(z) = \frac{e^{-\gamma z}}{z} \prod_{n=1}^\infty \left(1 + \frac{z}{n}\right)^{-1} e^\frac{z}{n}.$$

Now, the natural logarithm of the gamma function is easily representable:

$$\ln \Gamma(z) = -\gamma z - \ln(z) + \sum_{k=1}^\infty \left( \frac{z}{k} - \ln\left(1 + \frac{z}{k}\right) \right).$$

Finally, we arrive at a summation representation for the polygamma function:

$$\psi^{(n)}(z) = \frac{\mathrm{d}^{n+1}}{\mathrm{d}z^{n+1}}\ln \Gamma(z) = -\gamma \delta_{n0} - \frac{(-1)^n n!}{z^{n+1}} + \sum_{k=1}^{\infty} \left(\frac{1}{k} \delta_{n0} - \frac{(-1)^n n!}{(k+z)^{n+1}}\right)$$

Where δ_{n0} is the Kronecker delta.

Also the Lerch transcendent

$$\Phi(-1, m+1, z) = \sum_{k=0}^\infty \frac{(-1)^k}{(z+k)^{m+1}}$$

can be denoted in terms of polygamma function

$$\Phi(-1, m+1, z)=\frac1{(-2)^{m+1}m!}\left(\psi^{(m)}\left(\frac{z}{2}\right)-\psi^{(m)}\left(\frac{z+1}{2}\right)\right)$$

== Taylor series ==
The Taylor series at z = -1 is

$$\psi^{(m)}(z+1)= \sum_{k=0}^\infty (-1)^{m+k+1} \frac {(m+k)!}{k!} \zeta (m+k+1) z^k \qquad m \ge 1$$

and

$$\psi^{(0)}(z+1)= -\gamma +\sum_{k=1}^\infty (-1)^{k+1}\zeta (k+1) z^k$$

which converges for |z| < 1. Here, ζ is the Riemann zeta function. This series is easily derived from the corresponding Taylor series for the Hurwitz zeta function. This series may be used to derive a number of rational zeta series.

== Asymptotic expansion ==
These non-converging series can be used to get quickly an approximation value with a certain numeric at-least-precision for large arguments:

$$\psi^{(m)}(z) \sim (-1)^{m+1}\sum_{k=0}^{\infty}\frac{(k+m-1)!}{k!}\frac{B_k}{z^{k+m}} \qquad m \ge 1$$

and

$$\psi^{(0)}(z) \sim \ln(z) - \sum_{k=1}^\infty \frac{B_k}{k z^k}$$

where we have chosen B_{1} = 1/2, i.e. the Bernoulli numbers of the second kind.

== Inequalities ==
The hyperbolic cotangent satisfies the inequality

$$\frac{t}{2}\operatorname{coth}\frac{t}{2} \ge 1,$$

and this implies that the function

$$\frac{t^m}{1 - e^{-t}} - \left(t^{m-1} + \frac{t^m}{2}\right)$$

is non-negative for all m ≥ 1 and t ≥ 0. It follows that the Laplace transform of this function is completely monotone. By the integral representation above, we conclude that

$$(-1)^{m+1}\psi^{(m)}(x) - \left(\frac{(m-1)!}{x^m} + \frac{m!}{2x^{m+1}}\right)$$

is completely monotone. The convexity inequality e^{t} ≥ 1 + t implies that

$$\left(t^{m-1} + t^m\right) - \frac{t^m}{1 - e^{-t}}$$

is non-negative for all m ≥ 1 and t ≥ 0, so a similar Laplace transformation argument yields the complete monotonicity of

$$\left(\frac{(m-1)!}{x^m} + \frac{m!}{x^{m+1}}\right) - (-1)^{m+1}\psi^{(m)}(x).$$

Therefore, for all m ≥ 1 and x > 0,

$$\frac{(m-1)!}{x^m} + \frac{m!}{2x^{m+1}} \le (-1)^{m+1}\psi^{(m)}(x) \le \frac{(m-1)!}{x^m} + \frac{m!}{x^{m+1}}.$$

Since both bounds are strictly positive for $x>0$, we have:

- $\ln\Gamma(x)$ is strictly convex.
- For $m=0$, the digamma function, $\psi(x)=\psi^{(0)}(x)$, is strictly monotonic increasing and strictly concave.
- For $m$ odd, the polygamma functions, $\psi^{(1)},\psi^{(3)},\psi^{(5)},\ldots$, are strictly positive, strictly monotonic decreasing and strictly convex.
- For $m$ even the polygamma functions, $\psi^{(2)},\psi^{(4)},\psi^{(6)},\ldots$, are strictly negative, strictly monotonic increasing and strictly concave.

This can be seen in the first plot above.

=== Trigamma bounds and asymptote ===
For the case of the trigamma function ($m=1$) the final inequality formula above for $x>0$, can be rewritten as:

$$\frac{x+\frac12}{x^2} \le \psi^{(1)}(x)\le \frac{x+1}{x^2}$$

so that for $x\gg1$: $\psi^{(1)}(x)\approx\frac1x$.

== See also ==
- Factorial
- Gamma function
- Digamma function
- Trigamma function
- Generalized polygamma function
