= List of mathematical series =

This list of mathematical series contains formulae for finite and infinite sums. It can be used in conjunction with other tools for evaluating sums.

- Here, $0^0$ is taken to have the value $1$
- $\{x\}$ denotes the fractional part of $x$
- $B_n(x)$ is a Bernoulli polynomial.
- $B_n$ is a Bernoulli number, and here, $B_1=-\frac{1}{2}.$
- $E_n$ is an Euler number.
- $\zeta(s)$ is the Riemann zeta function.
- $\Gamma(z)$ is the gamma function.
- $\psi_n(z)$ is a polygamma function.
- $\operatorname{Li}_s(z)$ is a polylogarithm.
- $n \choose k$ is binomial coefficient
- $\exp(x)$ denotes exponential of $x$

== Sums of powers ==
See Faulhaber's formula.

- $\sum_{k=0}^m k^{n-1}=\frac{B_n(m+1)-B_n}{n}$

The first few values are:

- $\sum_{k=1}^m k=\frac{m(m+1)}{2}$
- $\sum_{k=1}^m k^2=\frac{m(m+1)(2m+1)}{6}=\frac{m^3}{3}+\frac{m^2}{2}+\frac{m}{6}$
- $\sum_{k=1}^m k^3 =\left[\frac{m(m+1)}{2}\right]^2=\frac{m^4}{4}+\frac{m^3}{2}+\frac{m^2}{4}$

See zeta constants.

- $\zeta(2n)=\sum^{\infty}_{k=1} \frac{1}{k^{2n}}=(-1)^{n+1} \frac{B_{2n} (2\pi)^{2n}}{2(2n)!}$

The first few values are:

- $\zeta(2)=\sum^{\infty}_{k=1} \frac{1}{k^2}=\frac{\pi^2}{6}$ (the Basel problem)
- $\zeta(4)=\sum^{\infty}_{k=1} \frac{1}{k^4}=\frac{\pi^4}{90}$
- $\zeta(6)=\sum^{\infty}_{k=1} \frac{1}{k^6}=\frac{\pi^6}{945}$

== Power series ==
=== Low-order polylogarithms ===
Finite sums:

- $\sum_{k=m}^{n} z^k = \frac{z^{m}-z^{n+1}}{1-z}$ (geometric series)
- $\sum_{k=0}^{n} z^k = \frac{1-z^{n+1}}{1-z}$
- $\sum_{k=1}^{n} z^k = \frac{1-z^{n+1}}{1-z}-1 = \frac{z-z^{n+1}}{1-z}$
- $\sum_{k=1}^n k z^k = z\frac{1-(n+1)z^n+nz^{n+1}}{(1-z)^2}$
- $\sum_{k=1}^n k^2 z^k = z\frac{1+z-(n+1)^2z^n+(2n^2+2n-1)z^{n+1}-n^2z^{n+2}}{(1-z)^3}$
- $\sum_{k=0}^n k^m z^k = \left(z \frac{d}{dz}\right)^m \frac{1-z^{n+1}}{1-z}$

Infinite sums, valid for $|z|<1$ (see polylogarithm):

- $\operatorname{Li}_n(z)=\sum_{k=1}^{\infty} \frac{z^k}{k^n}$

The following is a useful property to calculate low-integer-order polylogarithms recursively in closed form:

- $\frac{\mathrm{d}}{\mathrm{d}z}\operatorname{Li}_n(z)=\frac{\operatorname{Li}_{n-1}(z)}{z}$
- $\operatorname{Li}_{1}(z)=\sum_{k=1}^\infty \frac{z^k}{k}=-\ln(1-z)$
- $\operatorname{Li}_{0}(z)=\sum_{k=1}^\infty z^k=\frac{z}{1-z}$
- $\operatorname{Li}_{-1}(z)=\sum_{k=1}^\infty k z^k=\frac{z}{(1-z)^2}$
- $\operatorname{Li}_{-2}(z)=\sum_{k=1}^\infty k^2 z^k=\frac{z(1+z)}{(1-z)^3}$
- $\operatorname{Li}_{-3}(z)=\sum_{k=1}^\infty k^3 z^k =\frac{z(1+4z+z^2)}{(1-z)^4}$
- $\operatorname{Li}_{-4}(z)=\sum_{k=1}^\infty k^4 z^k =\frac{z(1+z)(1+10z+z^2)}{(1-z)^5}$

The Legendre chi functions are defined as follows:
$$\begin{align}
\chi_{2}(x) &= \sum_{n = 0}^{\infty} \frac{1}{(2n + 1)^2} x^{2n + 1} \\
\chi_{3}(x) &= \sum_{n = 0}^{\infty} \frac{1}{(2n + 1)^3} x^{2n + 1}
\end{align}$$

And the formulas presented below are called inverse tangent integrals:
$$\begin{align}
\text{Ti}_{2}(x) &= \sum_{n = 0}^{\infty} \frac{(-1)^{n}}{(2n + 1)^2} x^{2n + 1} \\
\text{Ti}_{3}(x) &= \sum_{n = 0}^{\infty} \frac{(-1)^{n}}{(2n + 1)^3} x^{2n + 1}
\end{align}$$

=== Exponential function ===
- $\sum_{k=0}^\infty \frac{z^k}{k!} = e^z$
- $\sum_{k=0}^\infty k\frac{z^k}{k!} = z e^z$ (cf. mean of Poisson distribution)
- $\sum_{k=0}^\infty k^2 \frac{z^k}{k!} = (z + z^2) e^z$ (cf. second moment of Poisson distribution)
- $\sum_{k=0}^\infty k^3 \frac{z^k}{k!} = (z + 3z^2 + z^3) e^z$
- $\sum_{k=0}^\infty k^4 \frac{z^k}{k!} = (z + 7z^2 + 6z^3 + z^4) e^z$
- $\sum_{k=0}^\infty k^n \frac{z^k}{k!} = z \frac{d}{dz} \sum_{k=0}^\infty k^{n-1} \frac{z^k}{k!}\,\! = e^z T_{n}(z)$

where $T_{n}(z)$ is the Touchard polynomials.

=== Trigonometric, inverse trigonometric, hyperbolic, and inverse hyperbolic functions relationship ===
- $\sum_{k=0}^\infty \frac{(-1)^k z^{2k+1}}{(2k+1)!}=\sin z$
- $\sum_{k=0}^\infty \frac{z^{2k+1}}{(2k+1)!}=\sinh z$
- $\sum_{k=0}^\infty \frac{(-1)^k z^{2k}}{(2k)!}=\cos z$
- $\sum_{k=0}^\infty \frac{z^{2k}}{(2k)!}=\cosh z$
- $\sum_{k=1}^\infty \frac{(-1)^{k-1}(2^{2k}-1)2^{2k}B_{2k}z^{2k-1}}{(2k)!}=\tan z, |z|<\frac{\pi}{2}$
- $\sum_{k=1}^\infty \frac{(2^{2k}-1)2^{2k}B_{2k}z^{2k-1}}{(2k)!}=\tanh z, |z|<\frac{\pi}{2}$
- $\sum_{k=0}^\infty \frac{(-1)^k2^{2k}B_{2k}z^{2k-1}}{(2k)!}=\cot z, |z|<\pi$
- $\sum_{k=0}^\infty \frac{2^{2k}B_{2k}z^{2k-1}}{(2k)!}=\coth z, |z|<\pi$
- $\sum_{k=0}^\infty \frac{(-1)^{k-1}(2^{2k}-2)B_{2k}z^{2k-1}}{(2k)!}=\csc z, |z|<\pi$
- $\sum_{k=0}^\infty \frac{-(2^{2k}-2)B_{2k}z^{2k-1}}{(2k)!}=\operatorname{csch} z, |z|<\pi$
- $\sum_{k=0}^\infty \frac{(-1)^kE_{2k}z^{2k}}{(2k)!}=\operatorname{sech} z, |z|<\frac{\pi}{2}$
- $\sum_{k=0}^\infty \frac{E_{2k}z^{2k}}{(2k)!}=\sec z, |z| < \frac{\pi}{2}$
- $\sum_{k=1}^\infty \frac{(-1)^{k-1} z^{2k}}{(2k)!}=\operatorname{ver}z$ (versine)
- $\sum_{k=1}^\infty \frac{(-1)^{k-1} z^{2k}}{2(2k)!}=\operatorname{hav}z$ (haversine)
- $\sum_{k=0}^\infty \frac{(2k)!z^{2k+1}}{2^{2k}(k!)^2(2k+1)}=\arcsin z, |z|\le1$
- $\sum_{k=0}^\infty \frac{(-1)^k(2k)!z^{2k+1}}{2^{2k}(k!)^2(2k+1)}=\operatorname{arcsinh} {z}, |z| \le 1$
- $\sum_{k=0}^\infty \frac{(-1)^kz^{2k+1}}{2k+1}=\arctan z, |z|<1$
- $\sum_{k=0}^\infty \frac{z^{2k+1}}{2k+1}=\operatorname{arctanh} z, |z|<1$
- $\ln2+\sum_{k=1}^\infty \frac{(-1)^{k-1}(2k)!z^{2k}}{2^{2k+1}k(k!)^2}=\ln\left(1+\sqrt{1+z^2}\right), |z| \le 1$
- $\sum_{k=2}^\infty \left( k \cdot \operatorname{arctanh}\left(\frac{1}{k}\right) - 1 \right) = \frac{3-\ln(4 \pi)}{2}$

=== Modified-factorial denominators ===
- $\sum^{\infty}_{k=0} \frac{(4k)!}{2^{4k} \sqrt{2} (2k)! (2k+1)!} z^k = \sqrt{\frac{1-\sqrt{1-z}}{z}}, |z|<1$
- $\sum^{\infty}_{k=0} \frac{2^{2k} (k!)^2}{(k+1) (2k+1)!} z^{2k+2} = \left(\arcsin{z}\right)^2, |z|\le1$
- $\sum^{\infty}_{n=0} \frac{\prod_{k=0}^{n-1}(4k^2+\alpha^2)}{(2n)!} z^{2n} + \sum^{\infty}_{n=0} \frac{\alpha \prod_{k=0}^{n-1}[(2k+1)^2+\alpha^2]}{(2n+1)!} z^{2n+1} = e^{\alpha \arcsin{z}}, |z|\le1$

=== Binomial coefficients ===
- $(1+z)^\alpha = \sum_{k=0}^\infty {\alpha \choose k} z^k, |z|<1$ (see Binomial theorem § Newton's generalized binomial theorem)
- $\sum_{k=0}^\infty {{\alpha+k-1} \choose k} z^k = \frac{1}{(1-z)^\alpha}, |z|<1$
- $\sum_{k=0}^\infty \frac{1}{k+1}{2k \choose k} z^k = \frac{1-\sqrt{1-4z}}{2z}, |z|\leq\frac{1}{4}$, generating function of the Catalan numbers
- $\sum_{k=0}^\infty {2k \choose k} z^k = \frac{1}{\sqrt{1-4z}}, |z|<\frac{1}{4}$, generating function of the Central binomial coefficients
- $\sum_{k=0}^\infty {2k + \alpha \choose k} z^k = \frac{1}{\sqrt{1-4z}}\left(\frac{1-\sqrt{1-4z}}{2z}\right)^\alpha, |z|<\frac{1}{4}$
- $\sum_{k=0}^\infty \frac{1}{{N + k \choose n}} = \frac{N}{(n-1){N \choose n}}, \quad N \geq n$

=== Harmonic numbers ===
(See harmonic numbers, themselves defined $H_n = \sum_{j=1}^{n} \frac{1}{j}$, and $H(x)$ generalized to the real numbers)

- $\sum_{k=1}^\infty H_k z^k = \frac{-\ln(1-z)}{1-z}, |z|<1$
- $\sum_{k=1}^\infty \frac{H_k}{k+1} z^{k+1} = \frac{1}{2}\left[\ln(1-z)\right]^2, \qquad |z|<1$
- $\sum_{k=1}^\infty \frac{(-1)^{k-1} H_{2k}}{2k+1} z^{2k+1} = \frac{1}{2} \arctan{z} \log{(1+z^2)}, \qquad |z|<1$
- $\sum_{n=0}^\infty \sum_{k=0}^{2n} \frac{(-1)^k}{2k+1} \frac{z^{4n+2}}{4n+2} = \frac{1}{4} \arctan{z} \log{\frac{1+z}{1-z}},\qquad |z|<1$
- $\sum_{n=1}^\infty \frac{x^2}{n^2(n+x)} = x\frac{\pi^2}{6} - H(x)$

=== Elliptic functions ===
The complete elliptic integrals of first kind K and of second kind E can be defined as follows:
$$\begin{align}
\frac{2}{\pi}K(x) &= \sum_{n = 0}^{\infty} \frac{[(2n)!]^2}{16^{n}(n!)^4}x^{2n} \\
\frac{2}{\pi}E(x) &= \sum_{n = 0}^{\infty} \frac{[(2n)!]^2}{(1 - 2n)16^{n}(n!)^4}x^{2n}
\end{align}$$

The Jacobi theta functions describe the world of the elliptic modular functions and they have these Taylor series:
$$\begin{align}
\vartheta_{00}(x) &= 1 + 2\sum_{n = 1}^{\infty} x^{n^2} \\
\vartheta_{01}(x) &= 1 + 2\sum_{n = 1}^{\infty} (-1)^{n} x^{n^2}
\end{align}$$

The regular partition number sequence P(n) has this generating function:
$$\vartheta_{00}(x)^{-1/6}\vartheta_{01}(x)^{-2/3}\biggl[\frac{\vartheta_{00}(x)^4 - \vartheta_{01}(x)^4}{16\,x}\biggr]^{-1/24} = \sum_{n=0}^{\infty} P(n)x^n = \prod_{k = 1}^{\infty} \frac{1}{1 - x^{k}}$$

The strict partition number sequence Q(n) has the generating function:
$$\vartheta_{00}(x)^{1/6}\vartheta_{01}(x)^{-1/3}\biggl[\frac{\vartheta_{00}(x)^4 - \vartheta_{01}(x)^4}{16\,x}\biggr]^{1/24} = \sum_{n=0}^{\infty} Q(n)x^n = \prod_{k = 1}^{\infty} \frac{1}{1 - x^{2k - 1}}$$

== Binomial coefficients ==
- $\sum_{k=0}^n {n \choose k} = 2^n$
- $\sum_{k=0}^n {n \choose k}^2 = {2n \choose n}$
- $\sum_{k=0}^n (-1)^k {n \choose k} = 0, \text{ where }n\geq 1$
- $\sum_{k=0}^n {k \choose m} = { n+1 \choose m+1 }$
- $\sum_{k=0}^n {m+k-1 \choose k} = { n+m \choose n }$ (see Multiset)
- $\sum_{k=0}^n {\alpha \choose k}{\beta \choose n-k} = {\alpha+\beta \choose n}, \text{where} \ \alpha + \beta \geq n$ (see Vandermonde identity)
- $\sum_{A \ \in \ \mathcal{P}(E)} 1 = 2^n \text{, where }E\text{ is a finite set, and card(}E\text{) = n}$
- $$\sum_{\begin{cases} (A,\ B) \ \in \ (\mathcal{P}(E))^2 \\ A \ \subset\ B \end{cases}} 1 = 3^n\text{, where }E\text{ is a finite set, and card(}E\text{) = n}$$
- $\sum_{A \ \in \ \mathcal{P}(E)} card(A) = n2^{n-1} \text{, where }E\text{ is a finite set, and card(}E\text{) = n}$

== Trigonometric functions ==
Sums of sines and cosines arise in Fourier series.

- $\sum_{k=1}^\infty \frac{\cos(k\theta)}{k}=-\frac{1}{2}\ln(2-2\cos\theta)=-\ln \left(2\sin\frac{\theta}{2} \right), 0<\theta<2\pi$
- $\sum_{k=1}^\infty \frac{\sin(k\theta)}{k}=\frac{\pi-\theta}{2}, 0<\theta<2\pi$
- $\sum_{k=1}^\infty \frac{(-1)^{k-1}}{k}\cos(k\theta)=\frac{1}{2}\ln(2+2\cos\theta)=\ln \left(2\cos\frac{\theta}{2}\right), 0\leq\theta<\pi$
- $\sum_{k=1}^\infty \frac{(-1)^{k-1}}{k}\sin(k\theta)=\frac{\theta}{2}, -\frac{\pi}{2}\leq\theta\leq\frac{\pi}{2}$
- $\sum_{k=1}^\infty \frac{\cos(2k\theta)}{2k}=-\frac{1}{2}\ln(2\sin\theta), 0<\theta<\pi$
- $\sum_{k=1}^\infty \frac{\sin(2k\theta)}{2k}=\frac{\pi-2\theta}{4}, 0<\theta<\pi$
- $\sum_{k=0}^\infty \frac{\cos[(2k+1)\theta]}{2k+1}=\frac{1}{2}\ln \left(\cot\frac{\theta}{2}\right), 0<\theta<\pi$
- $\sum_{k=0}^\infty \frac{\sin[(2k+1)\theta]}{2k+1}=\frac{\pi}{4}, 0<\theta<\pi$,
- $\sum_{k=1}^\infty \frac{\sin(2 \pi k x)}{k}= \pi \left(\dfrac{1}{2} - \{x\}\right), \ x \in \mathbb{R}$
- $\sum\limits_{k=1}^{\infty} \frac{\sin \left(2\pi kx \right)}{k^{2n-1}} = (-1)^{n}\frac{(2\pi)^{2n-1}}{2(2n-1)!} B_{2n-1}(\{x\}), \ x \in \mathbb{R}, \ n \in \mathbb{N}$
- $\sum\limits_{k=1}^{\infty} \frac{\cos \left(2\pi kx \right)}{k^{2n}} = (-1)^{n-1}\frac{(2\pi)^{2n}}{2(2n)!} B_{2n}(\{x\}), \ x \in \mathbb{R}, \ n \in \mathbb{N}$
- $B_n(x)=-\frac{n!}{2^{n-1}\pi^n}\sum_{k=1}^\infty \frac{1}{k^n}\cos\left(2\pi kx-\frac{\pi n}{2}\right), 0<x<1$
- $\sum_{k=0}^n \sin(\theta+k\alpha)=\frac{\sin\frac{(n+1)\alpha}{2}\sin(\theta+\frac{n\alpha}{2})}{\sin\frac{\alpha}{2}}$
- $\sum_{k=0}^n \cos(\theta+k\alpha)=\frac{\sin\frac{(n+1)\alpha}{2}\cos(\theta+\frac{n\alpha}{2})}{\sin\frac{\alpha}{2}}$
- $\sum_{k=1}^{n-1} \sin\frac{\pi k}{n}=\cot\frac{\pi}{2n}$
- $\sum_{k=1}^{n-1} \sin\frac{2\pi k}{n}=0$
- $\sum_{k=0}^{n-1} \csc^2\left(\theta+\frac{\pi k}{n}\right)=n^2\csc^2(n\theta)$
- $\sum_{k=1}^{n-1} \csc^2\frac{\pi k}{n}=\frac{n^2-1}{3}$
- $\sum_{k=1}^{n-1} \csc^4\frac{\pi k}{n}=\frac{n^4+10n^2-11}{45}$

== Roots of unity ==
A $n$'th root of unity is a solution to the equation $z^n = 1$ and they can be written like:

$$z_m = \exp\left(i \cdot \frac{2\pi m}{n}\right), \quad m \in \{0, \cdots, n-1 \}$$

The following summation identities hold:

$$\sum_{m \neq 0}^{n-1} \frac{1}{1-z_m} = \frac{n-1}{2}$$

$$\sum_{m \neq 0}^{n-1} \frac{1}{(1-z_m)^2} = \frac{(n-1)(5-n)}{12}$$

Let $k$ be an integer $0 < k < n$ then we also got:

$$\sum_{m = 0}^{n-1} z_m^k = 0$$

$$\sum_{m = 0}^{n-1} (x-z_m)^k = n \cdot x^k$$

$$\sum_{m \neq 0}^{n-1} \frac{(z_m)^k}{1-z_m} = \frac{2k-n-1}{2}$$

$$\sum_{m \neq 0}^{n-1} \frac{(z_m)^k}{(1-z_m)^2} = \frac{6k(n+2-k) - (n+1)(n+5)}{12}$$

== Rational functions ==
- $\sum_{n=a+1}^{\infty} \frac{a}{n^2 - a^2} = \frac{1}{2} H_{2a}$
- $\sum_{n=0}^\infty\frac{1}{n^2+a^2}=\frac{1+a\pi\coth (a\pi)}{2a^2}$
- $\sum_{n=0}^\infty\frac{(-1)^n}{n^2+a^2} = \frac{1 + a\pi \; \text{csch}(a\pi)}{2a^2}$
- $\sum_{n=0}^\infty\frac{(2n+1)(-1)^n}{(2n+1)^2+a^2}= \frac{\pi}{4} \text{sech} \left( \frac{a \pi}{2} \right)$
- $\displaystyle \sum_{n=0}^\infty \frac {1}{n^4+4a^4} = \dfrac{1}{8a^4}+\dfrac{\pi(\sinh(2\pi a)+\sin(2\pi a))}{8a^3(\cosh(2\pi a)-\cos(2\pi a))}$
- An infinite series of any rational function of $n$ can be reduced to a finite series of polygamma functions, by use of partial fraction decomposition, as explained here. This fact can also be applied to finite series of rational functions, allowing the result to be computed in constant time even when the series contains a large number of terms.

== Exponential function ==
- $\displaystyle \dfrac{1}{\sqrt{p}}\sum_{n=0}^{p-1}\exp \left(\frac{2\pi i n^2 q}{p} \right)=\dfrac{e^{\pi i/4}}{\sqrt{2q}}\sum_{n=0}^{2q-1}\exp \left(-\frac{\pi i n^2 p}{2q} \right)$(see the Landsberg–Schaar relation)
- $\displaystyle \sum_{n=-\infty}^\infty e^{-\pi n^2} = \frac{\sqrt[4] \pi}{\Gamma\left(\frac 3 4\right)}$

== Numeric series ==
These numeric series can be found by plugging in numbers from the series listed above.

=== Alternating harmonic series ===
- $\sum^{\infty}_{k=1}\frac{(-1)^{k+1}}{k}=\frac{1}{1}-\frac{1}{2}+\frac{1}{3}-\frac{1}{4}+\cdots=\ln 2$
- $\sum^{\infty}_{k=1}\frac{(-1)^{k+1}}{2k-1}=\frac{1}{1}-\frac{1}{3}+\frac{1}{5}-\frac{1}{7}+\frac{1}{9}-\cdots=\frac{\pi}{4}$

=== Alternating arithmetic series ===
Let $S(a,b)$ be defined as:

$S(a,b) = \sum^{\infty}_{k=0} \frac{(-1)^k}{ak+b}$

where $a,b>0$ are positive whole numbers. Then if $gcd(a,b) = c$ we can write $a = c\alpha$ and $b = c\beta$, where $gcd(\alpha,\beta) = 1$, and get:

$S(a,b) = S(c\alpha,c\beta) = \sum^{\infty}_{k=0} \frac{(-1)^k}{cdk+ce} = \frac{1}{c}\sum^{\infty}_{k=0} \frac{(-1)^k}{\alpha k+\beta} = \frac{S(\alpha,\beta)}{c}$

Now if $b>a$ we can, per Euclid's division lemma, write $b = c a + d$ where $a > d > 0$ and then

$S(a,b) = S(a, ca+d) = \sum^{\infty}_{k=0} \frac{(-1)^k}{ak+ca+d} = \sum^{\infty}_{k=0} \frac{(-1)^k}{a(k+c)+d} = \sum^{\infty}_{k=c} \frac{(-1)^{k-c}}{ak+d}$

where we now can add the remaining rows back and subtract them to give us:

$S(a,b) = (-1)^c \left( \sum^{\infty}_{k=0} \frac{(-1)^{k}}{ak+d} - \sum^{c-1}_{k=0} \frac{(-1)^{k}}{ak+d} \right) = (-1)^c \left( S(a,d) - \sum^{c-1}_{k=0} \frac{(-1)^{k}}{ak+d} \right)$

what that means is that all the infinite choices of $a$ and $b$ can essentially be boiled down to the cases where $gcd(a,b)=1$ and $a>b>0$. If we assume those two things we can then write:

$S(a,b) = \frac{1}{a} \left( \frac{\pi}{2 \sin\left(\frac{\pi b}{a}\right)} - 2\sum_{m=0}^{\lfloor\frac{a}{2}\rfloor} \cos\left(\pi\frac{(2m+1)b}{a}\right)\ln\left(\sin\left(\pi\frac{2m+1}{2a}\right)\right)\right)$

and in the case of using a negative sign instead:

$S_{-}(a,b) = \sum^{\infty}_{k=0} \frac{(-1)^k}{ak-b}$

the same two rules apply from above apply and then we can do the following for the case with $a > b > 0$ (since $a >a-b> 0$):

$S_{-}(a,b) = \sum^{\infty}_{k=0} \frac{(-1)^k}{ak-b} = -\frac{1}{b} + \sum^{\infty}_{k=0} \frac{(-1)^{k+1}}{a(k+1)-b} = -\frac{1}{b} - \sum^{\infty}_{k=0} \frac{(-1)^k}{ak+(a-b)} = -S(a,a-b)-\frac{1}{b}$

Let us test out the formula: $S(3,2) = \frac{1}{3} \left( \frac{\pi}{2 \sin\left(\frac{2\pi}{3}\right)} - 2 \left(\cos\left(\frac{2\pi}{3}\right)\ln\left(\sin\left(\frac{\pi}{6}\right)\right) + \cos\left(2\pi\right)\ln\left(\sin\left(\frac{\pi}{2}\right)\right) \right)\right) = \frac{\pi}{3\sqrt{3}} - \frac{\ln(2)}{3}$

=== Sum of reciprocal of factorials ===
- $\sum^{\infty}_{k=0} \frac{1}{k!}=\frac{1}{0!}+\frac{1}{1!}+\frac{1}{2!}+\frac{1}{3!}+\frac{1}{4!}+\cdots=e$
- $\sum^{\infty}_{k=0} \frac{1}{(2k)!}=\frac{1}{0!}+\frac{1}{2!}+\frac{1}{4!}+\frac{1}{6!}+\frac{1}{8!}+\cdots=\frac{1}{2}\left(e+\frac{1}{e}\right)=\cosh 1$
- $\sum^{\infty}_{k=0} \frac{1}{(3k)!}=\frac{1}{0!}+\frac{1}{3!}+\frac{1}{6!}+\frac{1}{9!}+\frac{1}{12!}+\cdots=\frac{1}{3}\left(e+\frac{2}{\sqrt{e}}\cos \frac{\sqrt{3}}{2}\right)$
- $\sum^{\infty}_{k=0} \frac{1}{(4k)!}=\frac{1}{0!}+\frac{1}{4!}+\frac{1}{8!}+\frac{1}{12!}+\frac{1}{16!}+\cdots=\frac{1}{2}\left(\cos 1+\cosh 1\right)$

=== Trigonometry and π ===
- $\sum^{\infty}_{k=0} \frac{(-1)^k}{(2k+1)!}=\frac{1}{1!}-\frac{1}{3!}+\frac{1}{5!}-\frac{1}{7!}+\frac{1}{9!}+\cdots=\sin 1$
- $\sum^{\infty}_{k=0} \frac{(-1)^k}{(2k)!}=\frac{1}{0!}-\frac{1}{2!}+\frac{1}{4!}-\frac{1}{6!}+\frac{1}{8!}+\cdots=\cos 1$
- $\sum^{\infty}_{k=1} \frac{1}{k^2+1}=\frac{1}{2}+\frac{1}{5}+\frac{1}{10}+\frac{1}{17}+\cdots=\frac{1}{2}(\pi \coth \pi - 1)$
- $\sum^{\infty}_{k=1} \frac{(-1)^k}{k^2+1}=-\frac{1}{2}+\frac{1}{5}-\frac{1}{10}+\frac{1}{17}+\cdots=\frac{1}{2}(\pi \operatorname{csch} \pi - 1)$
- $3 + \frac{4}{2\times3\times4} - \frac{4}{4\times5\times6} + \frac{4}{6\times7\times8} - \frac{4}{8\times9\times10} + \cdots = \pi$

=== Reciprocal of tetrahedral numbers ===
- $\sum^{\infty}_{k=1} \frac{1}{Te_k}=\frac{1}{1}+\frac{1}{4}+\frac{1}{10}+\frac{1}{20}+\frac{1}{35}+\cdots=\frac{3}{2}$

Where $Te_n=\sum^{n}_{k=1} T_k$

=== Exponential and logarithms ===
- $\sum^{\infty}_{k=0} \frac{1}{(2k+1)(2k+2)}=\frac{1}{1\times 2}+\frac{1}{3\times 4}+\frac{1}{5\times 6}+\frac{1}{7\times 8}+\frac{1}{9\times 10}+\cdots=\ln 2$
- $\sum^{\infty}_{k=1} \frac{1}{2^kk}=\frac{1}{2}+\frac{1}{8}+\frac{1}{24}+\frac{1}{64}+\frac{1}{160}+\cdots=\ln 2$
- $\sum^{\infty}_{k=1} \frac{(-1)^{k+1}}{2^kk}+\sum^{\infty}_{k=1} \frac{(-1)^{k+1}}{3^kk}=\Bigg(\frac{1}{2}+\frac{1}{3}\Bigg)-\Bigg(\frac{1}{8}+\frac{1}{18}\Bigg)+\Bigg(\frac{1}{24}+\frac{1}{81}\Bigg)-\Bigg(\frac{1}{64}+\frac{1}{324}\Bigg)+\cdots=\ln 2$
- $\sum^{\infty}_{k=1} \frac{1}{3^kk}+\sum^{\infty}_{k=1} \frac{1}{4^kk}=\Bigg(\frac{1}{3}+\frac{1}{4}\Bigg)+\Bigg(\frac{1}{18}+\frac{1}{32}\Bigg)+\Bigg(\frac{1}{81}+\frac{1}{192}\Bigg)+\Bigg(\frac{1}{324}+\frac{1}{1024}\Bigg)+\cdots=\ln 2$
- $\sum^{\infty}_{k=1} \frac{1}{n^kk}=\ln\left(\frac{n}{n-1}\right)$, that is $\forall n>1$

== See also ==
- Series (mathematics)
- List of integrals
- Summation § Identities
- Taylor series
- Binomial theorem
- Gregory's series
- On-Line Encyclopedia of Integer Sequences
