= Hurwitz zeta function =

Special function in mathematics

In mathematics, the Hurwitz zeta function is one of the many zeta functions. It is formally defined for complex variables s with Re(s) > 1 and a ≠ 0, −1, −2, ... by
$$\zeta(s,a) = \sum_{n=0}^\infty \frac{1}{(n+a)^{s}}.$$

This series is absolutely convergent for the given values of s and a and can be extended to a meromorphic function defined for all s ≠ 1. The Riemann zeta function is ζ(s, 1). The Hurwitz zeta function is named after Adolf Hurwitz, who introduced it in 1882.

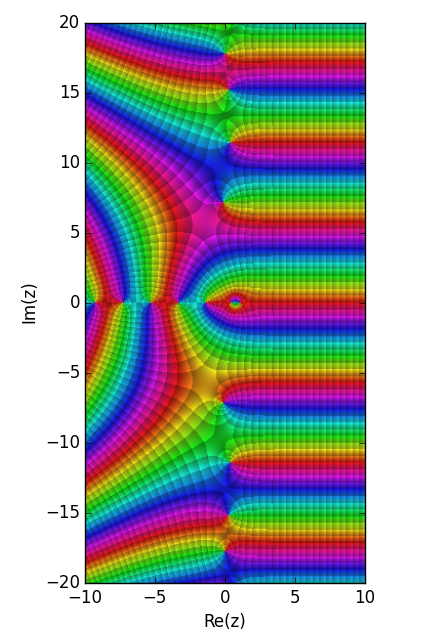
Hurwitz zeta function corresponding to a = 1/3, shown using domain coloring.

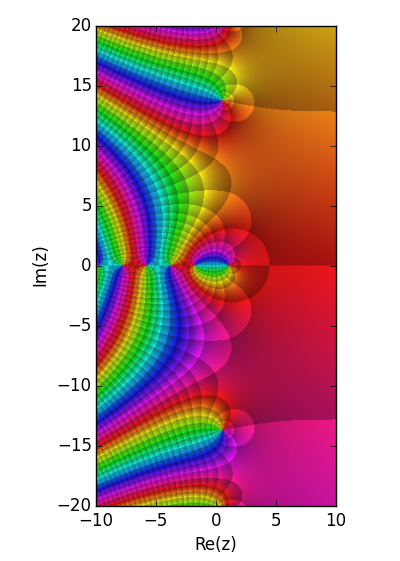
Hurwitz zeta function corresponding to a = 24/25.

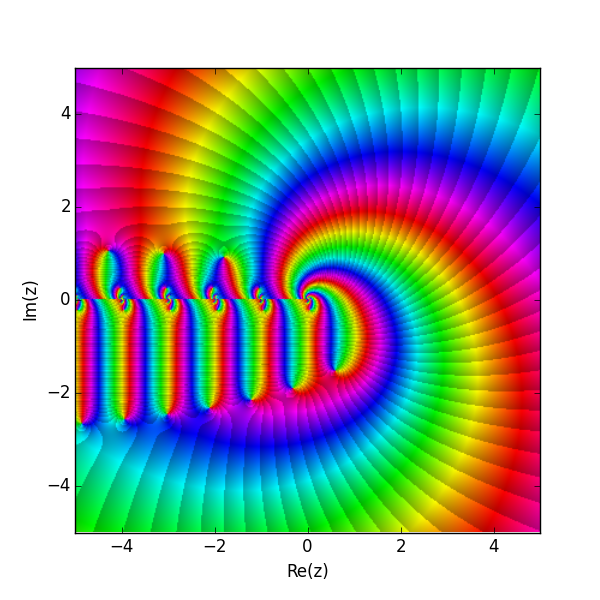
Hurwitz zeta function as a function of a with s = 3 + 4i.

== Integral representation ==
The Hurwitz zeta function has an integral representation
$$\zeta(s,a) = \frac{1}{\Gamma(s)} \int_0^\infty \frac{x^{s-1}e^{-ax}}{1-e^{-x}} dx$$
for $\operatorname{Re}(s)>1$ and $\operatorname{Re}(a)>0.$ (This integral can be viewed as a Mellin transform.) The formula can be obtained, roughly, by writing
$$\begin{align}
\zeta(s,a)\Gamma(s)
&= \sum_{n=0}^\infty \frac{1}{(n+a)^s} \int_0^\infty x^s e^{-x} \frac{dx}{x} \\[1ex]
&= \sum_{n=0}^\infty \int_0^\infty y^s e^{-(n+a)y} \frac{dy}{y}
\end{align}$$
and then interchanging the sum and integral.

The integral representation above can be converted to a contour integral representation
$$\zeta(s,a) = -\Gamma(1-s)\frac{1}{2 \pi i} \int_C \frac{(-z)^{s-1}e^{-az}}{1-e^{-z}} dz$$
where $C$ is a Hankel contour counterclockwise around the positive real axis, and the principal branch is used for the complex exponentiation $(-z)^{s-1}$. Unlike the previous integral, this integral is valid for all s, and indeed is an entire function of s.

The contour integral representation provides an analytic continuation of $\zeta(s,a)$ to all $s \ne 1$. At $s = 1$, it has a simple pole with residue $1$.

== Hurwitz's formula ==
The Hurwitz zeta function satisfies an identity which generalizes the functional equation of the Riemann zeta function:
$$\zeta(1-s,a) = \frac{\Gamma(s)}{(2\pi)^s} \left( e^{-\pi i s/2} \sum_{n=1}^\infty \frac{e^{2\pi ina}}{n^s} + e^{\pi i s/2} \sum_{n=1}^\infty \frac{e^{-2\pi ina}}{n^s} \right),$$
valid for Re(s) > 1 and 0 < a ≤ 1. The Riemann zeta functional equation is the special case a = 1:
$$\zeta(1-s) = \frac{2\Gamma(s)}{(2\pi)^{s}} \cos\left(\frac{\pi s}{2}\right) \zeta(s)$$

Hurwitz's formula can also be expressed as
$$\zeta(s,a) = \frac{2\Gamma(1-s)}{(2\pi)^{1-s}} \left( \sin\left(\frac{\pi s}{2}\right) \sum_{n=1}^\infty \frac{\cos(2\pi na)}{n^{1-s}} + \cos\left(\frac{\pi s}{2}\right) \sum_{n=1}^\infty \frac{\sin(2\pi na)}{n^{1-s}} \right)$$
(for Re(s) < 0 and 0 < a ≤ 1).

Hurwitz's formula has a variety of different proofs. One proof uses the contour integration representation along with the residue theorem. A second proof uses a theta function identity, or equivalently Poisson summation. These proofs are analogous to the two proofs of the functional equation for the Riemann zeta function in Riemann's 1859 paper. Another proof of the Hurwitz formula uses Euler–Maclaurin summation to express the Hurwitz zeta function as an integral
$$\zeta(s,a) = s \int_{-a}^\infty \frac{\lfloor x \rfloor - x + \frac{1}{2}}{(x+a)^{s+1}} dx$$
(−1 < Re(s) < 0 and 0 < a ≤ 1) and then expanding the numerator as a Fourier series.. Yet another proof of Hurwitz's formula uses Hermite's integral
$$\zeta(s,a)=\frac{1}{2}a^{-s}+\frac{a^{1-s}}{s-1}+2\int_0^\infty\frac{\sin(s\tan^{-1}(x/a))}{(a^2+x^2)^{s/2}\left(e^{2\pi x}-1\right)}dx,$$
by first revealing a nice connection between the Hurwitz zeta function and the Lommel functions.

=== Functional equation for rational a ===
When a is a rational number, Hurwitz's formula leads to the following functional equation: For integers $1\leq m \leq n$,
$$\zeta{\left(1{-}s, \frac{m}{n} \right)} =
\frac{2\Gamma(s)}{ \left(2\pi n\right)^s }
\sum_{k=1}^n \left[
\cos \left( \frac {\pi s} {2} -\frac {2\pi k m} {n} \right)\,
\zeta{\left( s, \frac {k}{n} \right)}
\right]$$
holds for all values of s.

This functional equation can be written as another equivalent form:
$$\zeta{\left(1{-}s, \frac{m}{n} \right)} = \frac{\Gamma(s)}{ \left(2\pi n\right)^s} \sum_{k=1}^n \left[e^{\frac{\pi is}{2} - \frac{2\pi ikm}{n}} \zeta{\left( s, \frac {k}{n} \right)} + e^{-\frac{\pi is}{2}+\frac{2\pi ikm}{n}} \zeta{\left( s,\frac {k}{n} \right)} \right].$$

== Some finite sums ==
Closely related to the functional equation are the following finite sums, some of which may be evaluated in a closed form

$$\sum_{r=1}^m \zeta{\left(s,\frac{r}{m}\right)}
\cos\dfrac{2\pi rk}{m} =\frac{m \Gamma(1-s)}{(2\pi m)^{1-s}}
\sin\frac{\pi s}{2} \cdot \left\{
\zeta{\left(1{-}s,\frac{k}{m}\right)}
+ \zeta{\left(1{-}s, 1{-}\frac{k}{m}\right)}
\right\}$$
$$\sum_{r=1}^m \zeta{\left(s,\frac{r}{m}\right)} \sin\dfrac{2\pi rk}{m}
= \frac{m \Gamma(1-s)}{(2\pi m)^{1-s}}
\cos \frac{\pi s}{2} \cdot \left\{
\zeta{\left(1{-}s,\frac{k}{m}\right)}
- \zeta{\left(1{-}s, 1{-}\frac{k}{m}\right)}
\right\}$$
$$\sum_{r=1}^{m-1} \zeta^2{\left(s,\frac{r}{m}\right)}
= \left(m^{2s-1}-1 \right)\zeta^2(s) + \frac{2m\Gamma^2(1-s)}{\left(2\pi m\right)^{2-2s}}
\sum_{\ell=1}^{m-1} \left\{
\zeta{\left(1{-}s,\frac{\ell}{m}\right)} - \cos(\pi s)\, \zeta{\left(1{-}s,1{-}\frac{\ell}{m}\right)}
\right\} \zeta{\left(1{-}s,\frac{\ell}{m}\right)}$$

where $m$ is positive integer greater than 2 and $s$ is complex, see e.g. Appendix B in.

== Series representation ==
A convergent Newton series representation defined for (real) a > 0 and any complex s ≠ 1 was given by Helmut Hasse in 1930:
$$\zeta(s,a) = \frac{1}{s-1}
\sum_{n=0}^\infty \frac{1}{n+1}
\sum_{k=0}^n (-1)^k \binom{n}{k} (a+k)^{1-s}.$$

This series converges uniformly on compact subsets of the s-plane to an entire function. The inner sum may be understood to be the nth forward difference of $a^{1-s}$; that is,
$$\Delta^n a^{1-s} = \sum_{k=0}^n (-1)^{n-k} \binom{n}{k} \left(a+k\right)^{1-s}$$
where Δ is the forward difference operator. Thus, one may write:
$$\begin{align}
\zeta(s, a) &= \frac{1}{s-1}\sum_{n=0}^\infty \frac{(-1)^n}{n+1} \Delta^n a^{1-s} \\
&= \frac{1}{s-1} {\log(1 + \Delta) \over \Delta} a^{1-s}
\end{align}$$

== Taylor series ==
The partial derivative of the zeta in the second argument is a shift:
$$\frac {\partial} {\partial a} \zeta (s,a) = -s\zeta(s+1,a).$$

Thus, the Taylor series can be written as:
$$\begin{align}
\zeta(s,x+y) &= \sum_{k=0}^\infty \frac{y^k}{k!} \frac {\partial^k} {\partial x^k} \zeta (s,x) \\
&= \sum_{k=0}^\infty \binom{s+k-1}{s-1} \left(-y\right)^k \zeta (s+k,x).
\end{align}$$

Alternatively,
$$\zeta(s, q) = \frac{1}{q^s} + \sum_{n=0}^{\infty} (-q)^n \binom{s + n - 1}{n} \zeta(s + n),$$
with $|q| < 1$.

Closely related is the Stark–Keiper formula:
$$\zeta(s,N) =
\sum_{k=0}^\infty \left[ N+\frac {s-1}{k+1}\right]
{s+k-1 \choose s-1} (-1)^k \zeta (s+k,N) ,$$
which holds for integer N and arbitrary s. See also Faulhaber's formula for a similar relation on finite sums of powers of integers.

== Laurent series ==
The Laurent series expansion can be used to define generalized Stieltjes constants that occur in the series
$$\zeta(s,a) = \frac{1}{s-1} + \sum_{n=0}^\infty \frac{(-1)^n}{n!} \gamma_n(a) (s-1)^n.$$

In particular, the constant term is given by
$$\lim_{s\to 1} \left[ \zeta(s,a) - \frac{1}{s-1}\right] =
\gamma_0(a) =
\frac{-\Gamma'(a)}{\Gamma(a)} = -\psi(a)$$
where $\Gamma$ is the gamma function and $\psi = \Gamma' / \Gamma$ is the digamma function. As a special case, $\gamma_0(1) = -\psi(1) = \gamma_0 = \gamma$.

== Discrete Fourier transform ==
The discrete Fourier transform of the Hurwitz zeta function with respect to the order s is the Legendre chi function.

== Particular values ==
=== Negative integers ===
The values of ζ(s, a) at s = 0, −1, −2, ... are related to the Bernoulli polynomials:
$$\zeta(-n,a) = -\frac{B_{n+1}(a)}{n+1}.$$
For example, the $n=0$ case gives
$$\zeta(0,a) = \frac{1}{2} - a.$$

=== s-derivative ===
The partial derivative with respect to s at s = 0 is related to the gamma function:
$$\left. \frac{\partial}{\partial s} \zeta(s,a) \right|_{s=0} = \log\Gamma(a) - \frac{1}{2} \log(2\pi)$$
In particular, $\zeta'(0) = -\frac{1}{2} \log(2\pi).$ The formula is due to Lerch.

== Relation to Jacobi theta function ==
If $\vartheta (z,\tau)$ is the Jacobi theta function, then
$$\int_0^\infty \left[\vartheta (z,it) -1 \right] t^{s/2} \frac{dt}{t}
= \pi^{-(1-s)/2} \Gamma{\left( \frac {1-s}{2} \right)} \left[ \zeta(1{-}s, z) + \zeta(1{-}s, 1{-}z) \right]$$
holds for $\Re s > 0$ and z complex, but not an integer. For z = n an integer, this simplifies to
$$\begin{align}
\int_0^\infty \left[\vartheta (n,it) -1 \right] t^{s/2} \frac{dt}{t}
&= 2 \pi^{-(1-s)/2} \ \Gamma{\left( \frac {1-s}{2} \right)} \zeta(1-s) \\
&= 2 \pi^{-s/2} \ \Gamma{\left( \frac {s}{2} \right)} \zeta(s).
\end{align}$$
where ζ here is the Riemann zeta function. Note that this latter form is the functional equation for the Riemann zeta function, as originally given by Riemann. The distinction based on z being an integer or not accounts for the fact that the Jacobi theta function converges to the periodic delta function, or Dirac comb in z as $t\rightarrow 0$.

== Relation to Dirichlet L-functions ==
At rational arguments the Hurwitz zeta function may be expressed as a linear combination of Dirichlet L-functions and vice versa: The Hurwitz zeta function coincides with Riemann's zeta function ζ(s) when a = 1, when a = 1/2 it is equal to (2^{s}−1)ζ(s), and if a = n/k with k > 2, (n,k) > 1 and 0 < n < k, then
$$\zeta(s,n/k) = \frac{k^s}{\varphi(k)} \sum_\chi \overline{\chi}(n)L(s,\chi),$$
the sum running over all Dirichlet characters mod k. In the opposite direction we have the linear combination
$$L(s,\chi) = \frac {1}{k^s} \sum_{n=1}^k \chi(n)\; \zeta{\left(s,\frac{n}{k}\right)}.$$
There is also the multiplication theorem
$$k^s\zeta(s) = \sum_{n=1}^k \zeta{\left(s,\frac{n}{k}\right)},$$
of which a useful generalization is the distribution relation
$$\sum_{p=0}^{q-1}\zeta(s,a+p/q)=q^s\,\zeta(s,qa).$$
(This last form is valid whenever q is a natural number and 1 − qa is not.)

== Zeros ==
If a = 1 the Hurwitz zeta function reduces to the Riemann zeta function itself; if a = 1/2 it reduces to the Riemann zeta function multiplied by a simple function of the complex argument s (vide supra), leading in each case to the difficult study of the zeros of Riemann's zeta function. In particular, there will be no zeros with real part greater than or equal to 1. However, if 0 < a < 1 and a ≠ 1/2, then there are zeros of Hurwitz's zeta function in the strip 1 < Re(s) < 1 + ε for any positive real number ε. This was proved by Davenport and Heilbronn for rational or transcendental irrational a, and by Cassels for algebraic irrational a.

== Rational values ==
The Hurwitz zeta function occurs in a number of striking identities at rational values. In particular, values in terms of the Euler polynomials $E_n(x)$:
$$E_{2n-1}\left(\frac{p}{q}\right) =
\left(-1\right)^n \frac{4(2n-1)!}{(2\pi q)^{2n}}
\sum_{k=1}^q \zeta{\left(2n,\frac{2k-1}{2q}\right)} \cos \frac{(2k-1)\pi p}{q}$$
and
$$E_{2n}\left(\frac{p}{q}\right) =
\left(-1\right)^n \frac{4(2n)!}{(2\pi q)^{2n+1}}
\sum_{k=1}^q \zeta{\left(2n+1,\frac{2k-1}{2q}\right)} \sin \frac{(2k-1)\pi p}{q}$$

One also has
$$\zeta{\left(s,\frac{2p-1}{2q}\right)} =
2 \left(2q\right)^{s-1} \sum_{k=1}^q \left[
C_s{\left(\frac{k}{q}\right)} \cos \frac{(2p-1)\pi k}{q} +
S_s{\left(\frac{k}{q}\right)} \sin \frac{(2p-1)\pi k}{q}
\right]$$
which holds for 1 ≤ p ≤ q. Here, the $C_\nu(x)$ and $S_\nu(x)$ are defined by means of the Legendre chi function $\chi_\nu$ as
$$C_\nu(x) = \operatorname{Re}\, \chi_\nu (e^{ix})$$
and
$$S_\nu(x) = \operatorname{Im}\, \chi_\nu (e^{ix}).$$

For integer values of ν, these may be expressed in terms of the Euler polynomials. These relations may be derived by employing the functional equation together with Hurwitz's formula, given above.

== Applications ==
Hurwitz's zeta function occurs in a variety of disciplines. Most commonly, it occurs in number theory, where its theory is the deepest and most developed. However, it also occurs in the study of fractals and dynamical systems. In applied statistics, it occurs in Zipf's law and the Zipf–Mandelbrot law. In particle physics, it occurs in a formula by Julian Schwinger, giving an exact result for the pair production rate of a Dirac electron in a uniform electric field.

== Special cases and generalizations ==
The Hurwitz zeta function with a positive integer m is related to the polygamma function:
$$\psi^{(m)}(z)= (-1)^{m+1} m! \zeta (m+1,z) \ .$$

The Barnes zeta function generalizes the Hurwitz zeta function.

The Lerch transcendent generalizes the Hurwitz zeta:
$$\Phi(z, s, q) = \sum_{k=0}^\infty \frac{z^k}{(k+q)^s}$$
and thus
$$\zeta(s,a) = \Phi(1, s, a).\,$$

Hypergeometric function

$$\zeta(s,a)=a^{-s}\cdot{}_{s+1}F_s(1,a_1,a_2,\ldots a_s;a_1+1,a_2+1,\ldots a_s+1;1)$$
where $a_1=a_2=\ldots=a_s=a\text{ and }a\notin\N\text{ and }s\in\N^+.$

Meijer G-function

$$\zeta(s,a)=G\,_{s+1,\,s+1}^{\,1,\,s+1}\left(-1 \; \left| \; \begin{matrix}0,1-a,\ldots,1-a\\0,-a,\ldots,-a\end{matrix}\right)\right.\qquad\qquad s\in\N^+.$$
