= Lerch transcendent =

Special mathematical function

In mathematics, the Lerch transcendent, is a special function that generalizes the Hurwitz zeta function and the polylogarithm. It is named after Czech mathematician Mathias Lerch, who published a paper about a similar function in 1887. The Lerch transcendent, is given by:

$$\Phi(z, s, \alpha) = \sum_{n=0}^\infty
\frac { z^n} {(n+\alpha)^s}$$.

It only converges for any real number $\alpha > 0$, where $|z| < 1$, or $\mathfrak{R}(s) > 1$, and $|z| = 1$.

== Special cases ==
The Lerch transcendent is related to and generalizes various special functions.

The Lerch zeta function is given by:

$$L(\lambda, s, \alpha) = \sum_{n=0}^\infty
\frac { e^{2\pi i\lambda n}} {(n+\alpha)^s}=\Phi(e^{2\pi i\lambda}, s,\alpha)$$

The Hurwitz zeta function is the special case

$$\zeta(s,\alpha) = \sum_{n=0}^\infty \frac{1}{(n+\alpha)^s} = \Phi(1,s,\alpha)$$

The polylogarithm is another special case:

$$\textrm{Li}_s(z) = \sum_{n=1}^\infty \frac{z^n}{n^s} =z\Phi(z,s,1)$$

The Riemann zeta function is a special case of both of the above:

$$\zeta(s) =\sum_{n=1}^\infty \frac{1}{n^s} = \Phi(1,s,1)$$

The Dirichlet eta function:

$$\eta(s) = \sum_{n=1}^\infty \frac{(-1)^{n-1}}{n^s} = \Phi(-1,s,1)$$

The Dirichlet beta function:

$$\beta(s) = \sum_{k=0}^\infty \frac{(-1)^{k}}{(2k+1)^s} = 2^{-s}\Phi(-1,s,\tfrac12)$$

The Dirichlet lambda function:

$$\lambda(s) = \sum_{k=0}^\infty \frac{1}{(2k+1)^s} = 2^{-s}\Phi(1,s,\tfrac12)$$

The Legendre chi function:

$$\chi_s(z) = \sum_{k=0}^\infty \frac{z^{2k+1}}{(2k+1)^s}= \frac {z}{2^s} \Phi(z^2,s,\tfrac12)$$

The inverse tangent integral:

$$\textrm{Ti}_s(z)= \sum_{k=0}^\infty \frac{(-1)^k z^{2k+1}}{(2k+1)^s}=\frac{z}{2^s}\Phi(-z^2,s,\tfrac12)$$

The polygamma functions for positive integers n:

$$\psi^{(n)}(\alpha)= (-1)^{n+1} n!\Phi (1,n+1,\alpha)$$

The Clausen function:

$$\text{Cl}_2(z)= \frac{ie^{-iz}}2 \Phi(e^{-iz},2,1)-\frac{ie^{iz}}2 \Phi(e^{iz},2,1)$$

== Integral representations ==
The Lerch transcendent has an integral representation:

$$\Phi(z,s,a)=\frac{1}{\Gamma(s)}\int_0^\infty
\frac{t^{s-1}e^{-at}}{1-ze^{-t}}\,dt$$

The proof is based on using the integral definition of the gamma function to write

$$\Phi(z,s,a)\Gamma(s)
= \sum_{n=0}^\infty \frac{z^n}{(n+a)^s} \int_0^\infty x^s e^{-x} \frac{dx}{x}
= \sum_{n=0}^\infty \int_0^\infty t^s z^n e^{-(n+a)t} \frac{dt}{t}$$

and then interchanging the sum and integral. The resulting integral representation converges for $z \in \Complex \setminus [1,\infty),$ Re(s) > 0, and Re(a) > 0. This analytically continues $\Phi(z,s,a)$ to z outside the unit disk. The integral formula also holds if z = 1, Re(s) > 1, and Re(a) > 0; see Hurwitz zeta function.

A contour integral representation is given by

$$\Phi(z,s,a)=-\frac{\Gamma(1-s)}{2\pi i} \int_C \frac{(-t)^{s-1}e^{-at}}{1-ze^{-t}}\,dt$$

where C is a Hankel contour counterclockwise around the positive real axis, not enclosing any of the points $t = \log(z) + 2k\pi i$ (for integer k) which are poles of the integrand. The integral assumes Re(a) > 0.

=== Other integral representations ===
A Hermite-like integral representation is given by

$$\Phi(z,s,a)=
\frac{1}{2a^s}+
\int_0^\infty \frac{z^t}{(a+t)^s}\,dt+
\frac{2}{a^{s-1}}
\int_0^\infty
\frac{\sin(s\arctan(t)-ta\log(z))}{(1+t^2)^{s/2}(e^{2\pi at}-1)}\,dt$$

for

$$\Re(a)>0\wedge |z|<1$$

and

$$\Phi(z,s,a)=\frac{1}{2a^s}+
\frac{\log^{s-1}(1/z)}{z^a}\Gamma(1-s,a\log(1/z))+
\frac{2}{a^{s-1}}
\int_0^\infty
\frac{\sin(s\arctan(t)-ta\log(z))}{(1+t^2)^{s/2}(e^{2\pi at}-1)}\,dt$$

for

$$\Re(a)>0.$$

Similar representations include

$$\Phi(z,s,a)= \frac{1}{2a^s} + \int_{0}^{\infty}\frac{\cos(t\log z)\sin\Big(s\arctan\tfrac{t}{a}\Big) - \sin(t\log z)\cos\Big(s\arctan\tfrac{t}{a}\Big)}{\big(a^2 + t^2\big)^{\frac{s}{2}} \tanh\pi t }\,dt,$$

and

$$\Phi(-z,s,a)= \frac{1}{2a^s} + \int_{0}^{\infty}\frac{\cos(t\log z)\sin\Big(s\arctan\tfrac{t}{a}\Big) - \sin(t\log z)\cos\Big(s\arctan\tfrac{t}{a}\Big)}{\big(a^2 + t^2\big)^{\frac{s}{2}} \sinh\pi t }\,dt,$$

holding for positive z (and more generally wherever the integrals converge). Furthermore,

$$\Phi(e^{i\varphi},s,a)=L\big(\tfrac{\varphi}{2\pi}, s, a\big)= \frac{1}{a^s} + \frac{1}{2\Gamma(s)}\int_{0}^{\infty}\frac{t^{s-1}e^{-at}\big(e^{i\varphi}-e^{-t}\big)}{\cosh{t}-\cos{\varphi}}\,dt,$$

The last formula is also known as Lipschitz formula.

== Identities ==
For λ rational, the summand is a root of unity, and thus $L(\lambda, s, \alpha)$ may be expressed as a finite sum over the Hurwitz zeta function. Suppose $\lambda = \frac{p}{q}$ with $p, q \in \Z$ and $q > 0$. Then $z = \omega = e^{2 \pi i \frac{p}{q}}$ and $\omega^q = 1$.

$$\Phi(\omega, s, \alpha) = \sum_{n=0}^\infty
\frac {\omega^n} {(n+\alpha)^s} = \sum_{m=0}^{q-1} \sum_{n=0}^\infty \frac {\omega^{qn + m}}{(qn + m + \alpha)^s} = \sum_{m=0}^{q-1} \omega^m q^{-s} \zeta \left( s,\frac{m + \alpha}{q} \right)$$

Various identities include:

$$\Phi(z,s,a)=z^n \Phi(z,s,a+n) + \sum_{k=0}^{n-1} \frac {z^k}{(k+a)^s}$$

and

$$\Phi(z,s-1,a)=\left(a+z\frac{\partial}{\partial z}\right) \Phi(z,s,a)$$

and

$$\Phi(z,s+1,a)=-\frac{1}{s}\frac{\partial}{\partial a} \Phi(z,s,a).$$

== Series representations ==
A series representation for the Lerch transcendent is given by

$$\Phi(z,s,q)=\frac{1}{1-z}
\sum_{n=0}^\infty \left(\frac{-z}{1-z} \right)^n
\sum_{k=0}^n (-1)^k \binom{n}{k} (q+k)^{-s}.$$

(Note that $\tbinom{n}{k}$ is a binomial coefficient.)

The series is valid for all s, and for complex z with Re(z)<1/2. Note a general resemblance to a similar series representation for the Hurwitz zeta function.

A Taylor series in the first parameter was given by Arthur Erdélyi. It may be written as the following series, which is valid for

$$\left|\log(z)\right| < 2 \pi;s\neq 1,2,3,\dots; a\neq 0,-1,-2,\dots$$
$$\Phi(z,s,a)=z^{-a}\left[\Gamma(1-s)\left(-\log (z)\right)^{s-1}
+\sum_{k=0}^\infty \zeta(s-k,a)\frac{\log^k (z)}{k!}\right]$$

If n is a positive integer, then

$$\Phi(z,n,a)=z^{-a}\left\{
\sum_{{k=0}\atop k\neq n-1}^ \infty \zeta(n-k,a)\frac{\log^k (z)}{k!}
+\left[\psi(n)-\psi(a)-\log(-\log(z))\right]\frac{\log^{n-1}(z)}{(n-1)!}
\right\},$$

where $\psi(n)$ is the digamma function.

A Taylor series in the third variable is given by

$$\Phi(z,s,a+x)=\sum_{k=0}^\infty \Phi(z,s+k,a)(s)_{k}\frac{(-x)^k}{k!};|x|<\Re(a),$$

where $(s)_{k}$ is the Pochhammer symbol.

Series at a = −n is given by

$$\Phi(z,s,a)=\sum_{k=0}^n \frac{z^k}{(a+k)^s}
+z^n\sum_{m=0}^\infty (1-m-s)_{m}\operatorname{Li}_{s+m}(z)\frac{(a+n)^m}{m!};\ a\rightarrow-n$$

A special case for n = 0 has the following series

$$\Phi(z,s,a)=\frac{1}{a^s}
+\sum_{m=0}^\infty (1-m-s)_m \operatorname{Li}_{s+m}(z)\frac{a^m}{m!}; |a|<1,$$

where $\operatorname{Li}_s(z)$ is the polylogarithm.

An asymptotic series for $s\rightarrow-\infty$

$$\Phi(z,s,a)=z^{-a}\Gamma(1-s)\sum_{k=-\infty}^\infty [2k\pi i-\log(z)]^{s-1}e^{2k\pi ai}$$

for $|a|<1;\Re(s)<0 ;z\notin (-\infty,0)$ and

$$\Phi(-z,s,a)=z^{-a}\Gamma(1-s)\sum_{k=-\infty}^\infty
[(2k+1)\pi i-\log(z)]^{s-1}e^{(2k+1)\pi ai}$$

for $|a|<1;\Re(s)<0 ;z\notin (0,\infty).$

An asymptotic series in the incomplete gamma function

$$\Phi(z,s,a)=\frac{1}{2a^s}+
\frac{1}{z^a}\sum_{k=1}^\infty
\frac{e^{-2\pi i(k-1)a}\Gamma(1-s,a(-2\pi i(k-1)-\log(z)))}
{(-2\pi i(k-1)-\log(z))^{1-s}}+
\frac{e^{2\pi ika}\Gamma(1-s,a(2\pi ik-\log(z)))}{(2\pi ik-\log(z))^{1-s}}$$

for $|a|<1;\Re(s)<0.$

The representation as a generalized hypergeometric function is

$$\Phi(z,s,\alpha)=\frac{1}{\alpha^s}{}_{s+1}F_s\left(\begin{array}{c}
1,\alpha,\alpha,\alpha,\cdots\\
1+\alpha,1+\alpha,1+\alpha,\cdots\\
\end{array}\mid z\right).$$

== Asymptotic expansion ==
The polylogarithm function $\mathrm{Li}_n(z)$ is defined as

$$\mathrm{Li}_0(z)=\frac{z}{1-z}, \qquad \mathrm{Li}_{-n}(z)=z \frac{d}{dz} \mathrm{Li}_{1-n}(z).$$

Let

$$\Omega_{a} \equiv\begin{cases}
\mathbb{C}\setminus[1,\infty) & \text{if } \Re a > 0, \\
{z \in \mathbb{C}, |z|<1} & \text{if } \Re a \le 0.
\end{cases}$$

For $|\mathrm{Arg}(a)|<\pi, s \in \mathbb{C}$ and $z \in \Omega_{a}$, an asymptotic expansion of $\Phi(z,s,a)$ for large $a$ and fixed $s$ and $z$ is given by

$$\Phi(z,s,a) = \frac{1}{1-z} \frac{1}{a^{s}}
+
\sum_{n=1}^{N-1} \frac{(-1)^{n} \mathrm{Li}_{-n}(z)}{n!} \frac{(s)_{n}}{a^{n+s}}
+O(a^{-N-s})$$

for $N \in \mathbb{N}$, where $(s)_n = s (s+1)\cdots (s+n-1)$ is the Pochhammer symbol.

Let

$$f(z,x,a) \equiv \frac{1-(z e^{-x})^{1-a}}{1-z e^{-x}}.$$

Let $C_{n}(z,a)$ be its Taylor coefficients at $x=0$. Then for fixed $N \in \mathbb{N}, \Re a > 1$ and $\Re s > 0$,

$$\Phi(z,s,a) - \frac{\mathrm{Li}_{s}(z)}{z^{a}}
=
\sum_{n=0}^{N-1}
C_{n}(z,a) \frac{(s)_{n}}{a^{n+s}}
+
O\left( (\Re a)^{1-N-s}+a z^{-\Re a} \right),$$

as $\Re a \to \infty$.

== Software ==
The Lerch transcendent is implemented as LerchPhi in Maple and Mathematica, and as lerchphi in mpmath and SymPy.
