= Mathias Lerch =

Czech mathematician (1860-1922)

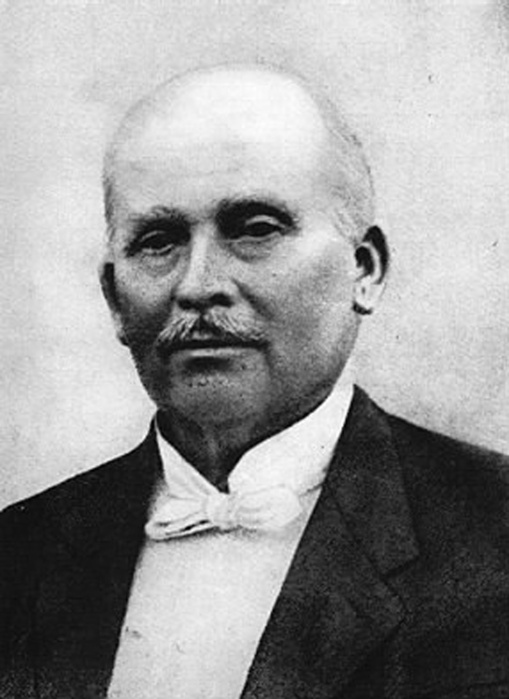
Mathias Lerch

Mathias Lerch or Matyáš Lerch (Czech: [ˈlɛrx]; 20 February 1860, Milínov – 3 August 1922, Sušice) was a Czech mathematician who published about 250 papers, largely on mathematical analysis and number theory. He studied in Prague (Czech Technical University) and Berlin; subsequently held teaching positions at the University of Fribourg in Switzerland, the Brno University of Technology in Brno, and finally at then newly founded (1920) Masaryk University in Brno where he became its first mathematics professor.

In 1900, he was awarded the Grand Prize of the French Academy of Sciences for his number-theoretic work. The Lerch zeta function is named after him, as is the Appell–Lerch sum. His doctoral students include Michel Plancherel and Otakar Borůvka.
