= Milínov =

- Municipality
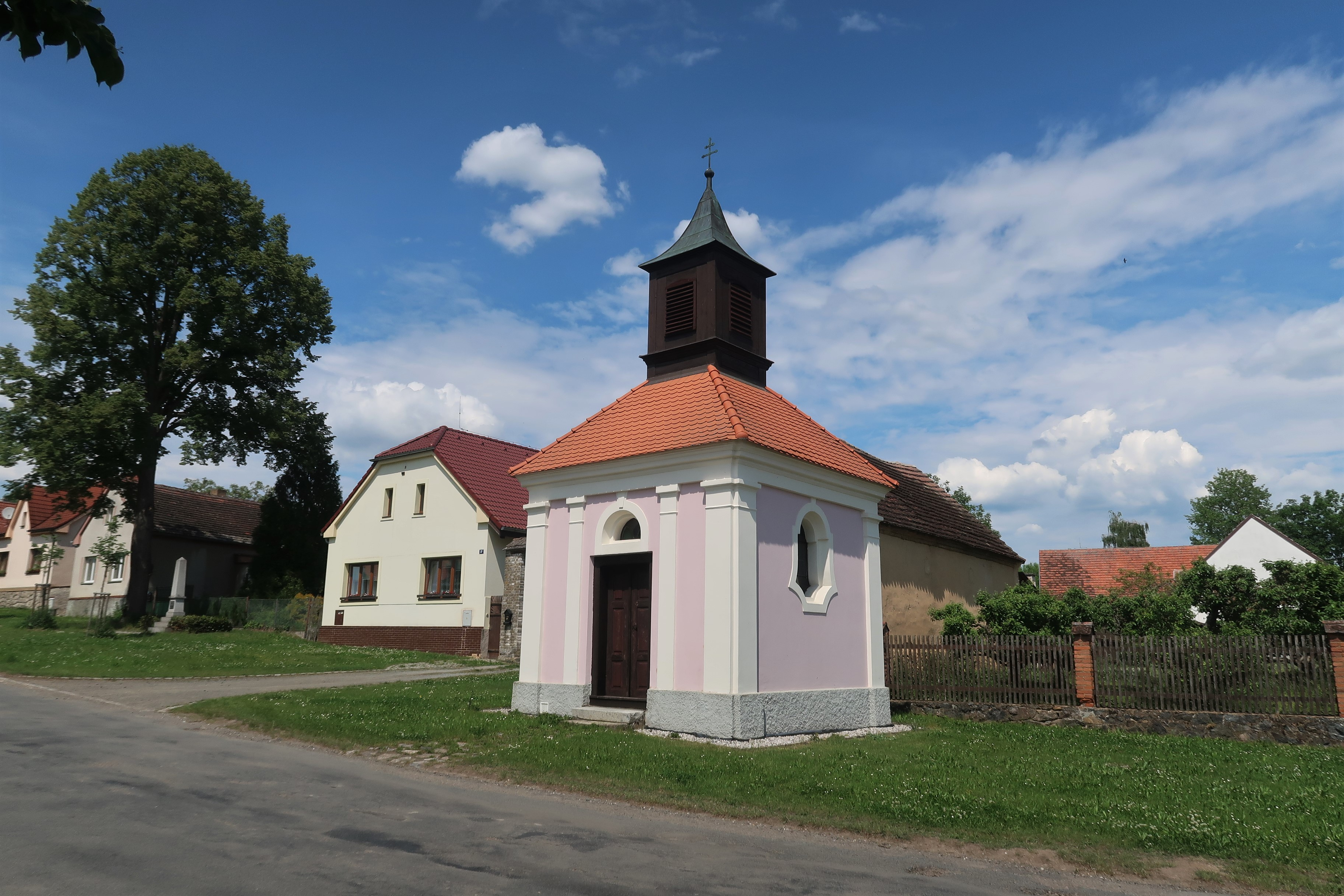
- Centre of Milínov

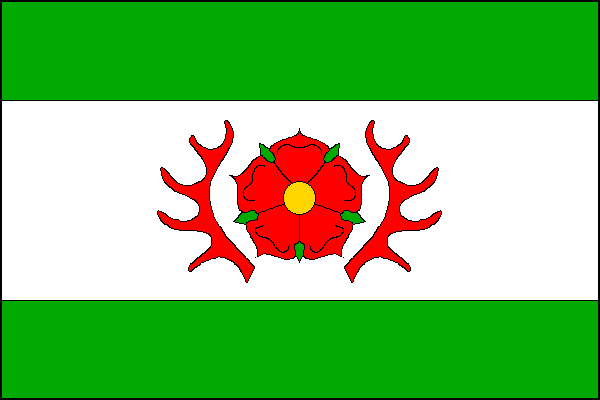
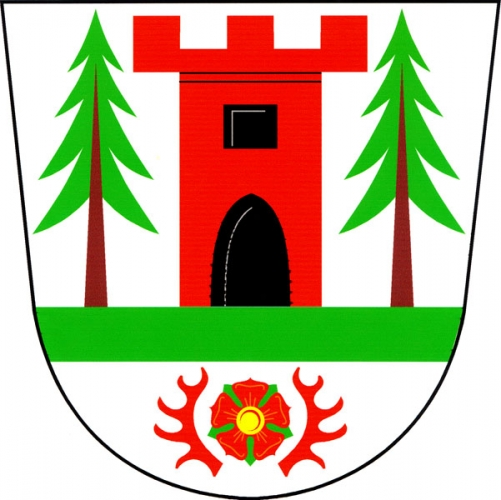
- Flag Coat of arms

- Location in the Czech Republic
- Coordinates: 49°38′35″N 13°33′58″E
- Country: Czech Republic
- Region: Plzeň
- District: Plzeň-South
- First mentioned: 1379

Area
  - Total: 12.27 km^{2} (4.74 sq mi)
- Elevation: 438 m (1,437 ft)

Population (2026-01-01)
  - Total: 230
  - Density: 19/km^{2} (49/sq mi)
- Time zone: UTC+1 (CET)
  - Summer (DST): UTC+2 (CEST)
- Postal code: 332 04
- Website: www.obecmilinov.cz

Milínov is a municipality and village in Plzeň-South District in the Plzeň Region of the Czech Republic. It has about 200 inhabitants.

Milínov lies approximately 18 kilometres (11 mi) south-east of Plzeň and 78 km (48 mi) south-west of Prague.

== Demographics ==
Historical population
Year	Pop.	±%
1869	418	—
1880	425	+1.7%
1890	424	−0.2%
1900	453	+6.8%
1910	446	−1.5%
1921	453	+1.6%
1930	363	−19.9%
1950	295	−18.7%
1961	300	+1.7%
1970	280	−6.7%
1980	247	−11.8%
1991	206	−16.6%
2001	173	−16.0%
2011	181	+4.6%
2021	192	+6.1%
Source: Censuses
