= Legendre chi function =

Mathematical function

In mathematics, the Legendre chi function (named after Adrien-Marie Legendre) is a special function whose Taylor series is also a Dirichlet series, given by
$$\chi_\nu(z) = \sum_{k=0}^\infty \frac{z^{2k+1}}{(2k+1)^\nu}.$$

Legendre chi function

As such, it resembles the Dirichlet series for the polylogarithm, and, indeed, is trivially expressible as the odd part of the polylogarithm
$$\chi_\nu(z) = \frac{1}{2}\left[\operatorname{Li}_\nu(z) - \operatorname{Li}_\nu(-z)\right].$$

The Legendre chi function appears as the discrete Fourier transform, with respect to the order ν, of the Hurwitz zeta function, and also of the Euler polynomials, with the explicit relationships given in those articles.

The Legendre chi function is a special case of the Lerch transcendent, and is given by
$$\chi_\nu(z)=2^{-\nu}z\,\Phi (z^2,\nu,1/2).$$

== Identities ==
$$\chi_{-1}\left(x\right)=\frac{x\left(1+x^{2}\right)}{\left(1-x^{2}\right)^{2}}$$
$$\chi_{0}\left(x\right)=\frac{x}{1-x^{2}}$$
$$\chi_1(x) =\operatorname{arctanh}(x) =\frac{1}{2}\ln\left(\frac{1+x}{1-x}\right)$$
$$\chi_2(x) = \int_{0}^{x}\frac{\operatorname{arctanh}(t)}t \mathrm dt$$
$$\chi_\infty(x) = x$$
$$\frac{\mathrm d}{\mathrm dx}\chi_\nu(x) = \frac{\chi_{\nu-1}(x)}{x}$$
$$\frac{\mathrm d}{\mathrm dx}\chi_2(x) = \frac{\operatorname{arctanh}(x)}{x}$$
$$\chi_2(x) + \chi_2(1/x)=\left\{\begin{array}{rcl}
\frac{1}{4}\bigl(\ln^2(x)-\ln^2(-x)\bigr) & \text{for} & |x|>1\\[4pt]
\frac{1}{4}\bigl(\ln^2(1/x)-\ln^2(-1/x)\bigr) & \text{for}  & |x|\le1\setminus\{0\}
\end{array}\right.$$
$$\chi_2(x)+\chi_2\left(\frac{1-x}{1+x}\right)=\frac{\pi^2}{8}+\ln(x)\operatorname{arctanh}(x), \quad x\in(0,1)$$

== Special Values ==
It takes the special values:

$$\chi_2(1) = \frac{\pi^2}{8}$$
$$\chi_2(-1) = -\frac{\pi^2}{8}$$
$$\chi_2(\sqrt{2}-1)	=	\frac{\pi^2}{16}-\frac14\ln^2(\sqrt{2}+1)$$
$$\chi_2\left(\frac{\sqrt{5}-1}{2}\right)	=	\frac{\pi^2}{12}-\frac{3}{4}\ln^2\left(\varphi\right), ~ \text{where} ~ \varphi = \frac{1 + \sqrt{5}}{2}, \text{ which is the golden ratio.}$$
$$\chi_2(\sqrt{5}-2)	=	\frac{\pi^2}{24}-\frac{3}{4}\ln^2\left(\varphi\right)$$
$$\chi_2(i) = iK,$$

where $i$ is the imaginary unit and K is Catalan's constant. Other special values include:

$$\chi_n(1)	=	\lambda(n)$$
$$\chi_n(i)	=	i\beta(n),$$

where $\lambda(n)$ is the Dirichlet lambda function and $\beta(n)$ is the Dirichlet beta function.

== Integral relations ==
$$\int_0^{\pi/2} \arcsin (r \sin \theta)\, \mathrm d\theta
= \chi_2(r),
\qquad\int_0^{\pi/2} \arccos (r \cos \theta)\, \mathrm d\theta
= \left(\frac{\pi}{2}\right)^2-\chi_2(r)\qquad {\rm if}~~|r|\leq 1$$
$$\int_0^{\pi/2} \arctan (r \sin \theta) \,\mathrm d\theta
= -\frac{1}{2}\int_0^{\pi} \frac{ r \theta \cos \theta}{1+ r^2 \sin^2 \theta} \,\mathrm d\theta
= 2 \chi_2\!\!\left(\frac{\sqrt{1+r^2}- 1}{r}\right),\quad r\ne0$$
$$\int_0^{\pi/2} \arctan (p \sin \theta)\arctan (q \sin \theta) \,\mathrm d\theta = \pi \chi_2\!\!\left(\frac{\sqrt{1+p^2}- 1}{p}\cdot\frac{\sqrt{1+q^2}- 1}{q}\right), \quad p,q\ne0$$
$$\int_0^{\pi/2}\operatorname{arctanh}(p\sin\theta)\operatorname{arctanh}(q\sin\theta)\,\mathrm d\theta=\pi\chi_2\!\!\left(\frac{1-\sqrt{1-p^2}}{p}\cdot\frac{1-\sqrt{1-q^2}}{q}\right),\quad |p|,|q|\le1\setminus\{0\}$$
$$\int_0^{\alpha}\!\!\int_0^{\beta} \frac{\mathrm dx\, \mathrm dy}{1-x^2 y^2} = \chi_2(\alpha\beta)\qquad {\rm if}~~|\alpha\beta|\leq 1$$
