= Hankel contour =

Mathematical concept

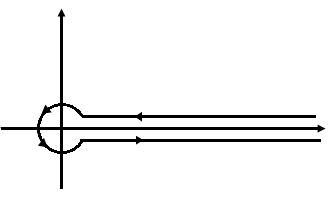
A Hankel contour path, traversed in the positive sense.

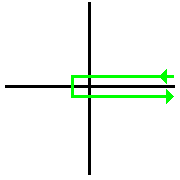
This is a version of the Hankel contour that consists of just a linear mirror image across the real axis.

In mathematics, a Hankel contour is a path in the complex plane which extends from (+∞,δ), around the origin counter clockwise and back to (+∞,−δ), where δ is an arbitrarily small positive number. The contour thus remains arbitrarily close to the real axis but without crossing the real axis except for negative values of x. The Hankel contour can also be represented by a path that has mirror images just above and below the real axis, connected to a circle of radius ε, centered at the origin, where ε is an arbitrarily small number. The two linear portions of the contour are said to be a distance of δ from the real axis. Thus, the total distance between the linear portions of the contour is 2δ. The contour is traversed in the positively-oriented sense, meaning that the circle around the origin is traversed counter-clockwise.

The general principle is that δ and ε are infinitely small and that the integration contour does not envelop any non-analytic point of the function to be integrated except possibly, in zero. Under these conditions, in accordance with Cauchy's theorem, the value of the integral is the same regardless of δ and ε. Usually, the operation consists of calculating first the integral for non zero values of δ and ε, and then making them tend to 0.

Use of Hankel contours is one of the methods of contour integration. This type of path for contour integrals was first explicitly used by Hermann Hankel in his investigations of the Gamma function, though Riemann already implicitly used it in his paper on the Riemann zeta function in 1859.

The Hankel contour is used to evaluate integrals such as the Gamma function, the Riemann zeta function, and other Hankel functions (which are Bessel functions of the third kind).

== General Principles ==
The Hankel contour, in its general form is always split in 3 partial paths :

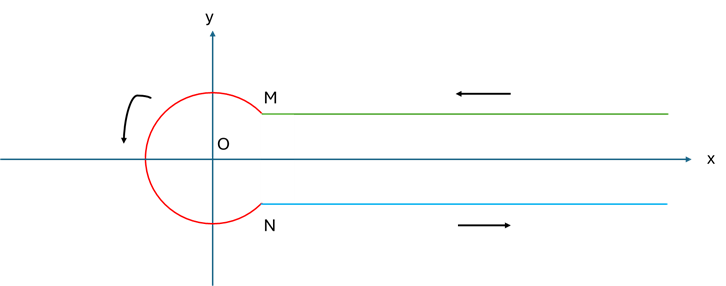
Hankel Contour in coloured sections

Integration must be carried out on the green semi-axis above the Ox axis from right to left from infinity to point M, then following the part of the red circle counter-clockwise to point N and finally on the blue semi-axis below the Ox axis from left to right to infinity. M (and all the horizontal axis to its right) has a complex part iδ. Conversely, N (and all the axis to its right) has the complex part -iδ. The integral is thus calculated along each path separately before summing them.

== Applications ==
=== The Hankel contour and the Gamma function ===
The Hankel contour is helpful in expressing and solving the Gamma function in the complex t-plane. The Gamma function can be defined for any complex value in the plane if we evaluate the integral along the Hankel contour. The Hankel contour is especially useful for expressing the Gamma function for any complex value because the end points of the contour vanish, and thus allows the fundamental property of the Gamma function to be satisfied, which states $\Gamma(z+1)=z\Gamma(z)$.

==== Derivation of the contour integral expression of the Gamma function ====
The Hankel contour can be used to help derive an expression for the Gamma function, based on the fundamental property $\Gamma(z+1) = z \Gamma(z)$. Assume an ansatz of the form $\Gamma(z)=\int_C f(t)t^{z-1} dt$, where $C$ is the Hankel contour.

Inserting this ansatz into the fundamental property and integrating by parts on the right-hand side, one obtains
$$\int_C f(t)t^z dt = [t^z f(t)] - \int_C t^z f'(t)dt.$$

Thus, assuming $f(t)$ decays sufficiently quickly such that $t^z f(t)$ vanishes at the endpoints of the Hankel contour,
$$\int_C t^z (f(t) + f'(t)) dt = 0 \implies f(t)+f'(t)=0.$$

The solution to this differential equation is $f(t)=Ae^{-t}.$ While $A$ is a constant with respect to $t$, $A$ may nonetheless be a function of $z$. Substituting $f(t)$ into the original integral then gives
$$\Gamma(z)=A(z)\int_C e^{-t} (-t)^{z-1}dt,$$
where the minus sign in $(-t)^{z-1}$ is accounted for by absorbing a factor $(-1)^{z-1}$ into the definition of $A(z)$.

Let us note $I_c = \int_C e^{-t} (-t)^{z-1}dt$. We have :

$$\Gamma(z)=A(z) I_c$$

As stated above, the integral I_{c} over the entire contour C is the sum of three integrals:

- The one on the semi-axis ]+∞, M] of imaginary part +iδ which will be referred as $I_{\delta}^{+}$
- That on the partial circle between M and N that will be referred as Iε
- The one on the semi-axis [N, +∞[ of imaginary part -iδ which will be referred as $I_{\delta}^{-}$

Iε can be discarded as it tends to 0 when ε tends to 0.

For $I_{\delta}^{+}$ and $I_{\delta}^{-}$, the expression $(-t)^{z-1}$ will be put in the form $e^{(z-1)\log(-t)}$.

Any complex c can be written as ρ(cos(θ) + i sin(θ)), or ρ$e^{i\theta}$ with positive or zero real ρ and real θ. If one requires that θ be between -π (not included) and +π, θ is unique if c is not zero. θ is named the argument of the complex c and ρ is its modulus (unique in all cases). The complex logarithm of c is defined as being equal to log(ρ) + iθ, log(ρ) being the usual real logarithm and θ belonging to ]-π, π].

Let us first calculate $I_{\delta}^{-}$. The variable t on the segment [N, +∞[ can be parameterized by its real part x. The real part of N will be noted x(δ). This real tends to 0 when δ and ε tend to 0.

$$I_{\delta}^{-} = \int_{x(\delta)}^{+\infty} e^{-t} (-t)^{z-1} dt$$

$$I_{\delta}^{-} = \int_{x(\delta)}^{+\infty} e^{-t} e^{(z-1)Log(-t)} dt$$

t = x – iδ on the blue segment below the x-axis. As noted above, it can be written as $\rho(t) e^{i\theta(t)}$ with θ(t) belonging to ]+π, π].

In fact, θ(t) belongs to ]-π/2, 0] since t is located in the lower right quadrant of the complex plane. To go from t to -t, one has to add or subtract π to θ(t). Since we want the argument of -t to be between -π (not included) and +π, in order to conform to the definition of the complex logarithm, we must add π to θ(t).

Hence, replacing t by x – iδ:

$$I_{\delta}^{-} = \int_{x(\delta)}^{+\infty} e^{-x + i\delta} e^{(z-1)(Log(x - i\delta) + i\pi)} dx$$

For Iδ+, the segment ]+∞, M] can be parameterized by x with t = x + iδ. If we integrate between M and infinity, we will have the opposite of the integral we are looking for since the segment is oriented in the other way.

So, $I_{\delta}^{+} = - \int_{x(\delta)}^{+\infty} e^{-t} e^{(z-1)Log(-t)} dt$

This time, t being located in the upper right quadrant of the complex plane, we must remove π from its argument to get -t in order to be in the value interval of the complex logarithm. We therefore have:

$$I_{\delta}^{+} = -  \int_{x(\delta)}^{+\infty} e^{-x - i\delta} e^{(z-1)(Log(x + i\delta) - i\pi)} dx$$

When δ tends to 0, Ic = Iδ+ + Iδ- becomes :
$$I_c = - \int_0^{+\infty} e^{-x} e^{(z-1)(Log(x) - i\pi)}dx + \int_0^{+\infty} e^{-x} e^{(z-1)(Log(x) + i\pi)}dx$$

which we can factorize as :

$$I_c = [-e^{- i\pi(z-1)} + e^{+ i\pi(z-1)}] \int_0^{+\infty} e^{-x} e^{(z-1)Log(x)} dx$$

Then, $-e^{-i\pi(z-1)} + e^{i\pi(z-1)} = -2 i \sin(\pi z)$, and $\int_0^{+\infty} e^{-x} e^{(z-1)Log(x)} dx = \int_0^{+\infty} e^{-x} x^{z-1} dx = \Gamma(z)$

So, we have : $I_c = -2 i \sin(\pi z) \Gamma(z)$

but at the same time (see definition of $I_c$ above) :
$$\Gamma(z)=A(z) I_c$$

so, $A(z) = \frac 1 {-2 i \sin(\pi z)} = \frac i {2\sin (\pi z)}$

Then by integrating along the Hankel contour, the contour integral expression of the Gamma function has become $\Gamma(z)=\frac{i}{2\sin{\pi z}}\int_C e^{-t}(-t)^{z-1}dt$.
