= Genocchi number =

Mathematical sequence of integers

In mathematics, the Genocchi numbers G_{n}, named after Angelo Genocchi, are a sequence of integers that satisfy the relation

$$\frac{2t}{1+e^{t}}=\sum_{n=0}^\infty G_n\frac{t^n}{n!}$$

The first few Genocchi numbers are 0, 1, −1, 0, 1, 0, −3, 0, 17 (sequence A226158 in the OEIS), see OEIS: A001469.

$G_n=2(1-2^n)(-n\zeta(1-n)),$

where $\zeta(1-n)$ is the Riemann zeta function.

== Properties ==
- The generating function definition of the Genocchi numbers implies that they are rational numbers. In fact, G_{2n+1} = 0 for n ≥ 1 and (−1)^{n}G_{2n} is an odd positive integer.
- Genocchi numbers G_{n} are related to Bernoulli numbers B_{n} by the formula

$$G_{n}=2 \,(1-2^n) \,B_n.$$

== Combinatorial interpretations ==
The exponential generating function for the signed even Genocchi numbers (−1)^{n}G_{2n} is

$$t\tan \left(\frac{t}{2} \right)=\sum_{n\geq 1} (-1)^n G_{2n}\frac{t^{2n}}{(2n)!}$$

They enumerate the following objects:

- Permutations in S_{2n−1} with descents after the even numbers and ascents after the odd numbers.
- Permutations π in S_{2n−2} with 1 ≤ π(2i−1) ≤ 2n−2i and 2n−2i ≤ π(2i) ≤ 2n−2.
- Pairs (a_{1},...,a_{n−1}) and (b_{1},...,b_{n−1}) such that a_{i} and b_{i} are between 1 and i and every k between 1 and n−1 occurs at least once among the a_{i}'s and b_{i}'s.
- Reverse alternating permutations a_{1} < a_{2} > a_{3} < a_{4} >...>a_{2n−1} of [2n−1] whose inversion table has only even entries.

== Primes ==
The only known prime numbers which occur in the Genocchi sequence are 17, at n = 8, and −3, at n = 6 (depending on how primes are defined). It has been proven that no other primes occur in the sequence

== See also ==
- Euler number
