= Allgemeine Zeitung des Judentums =

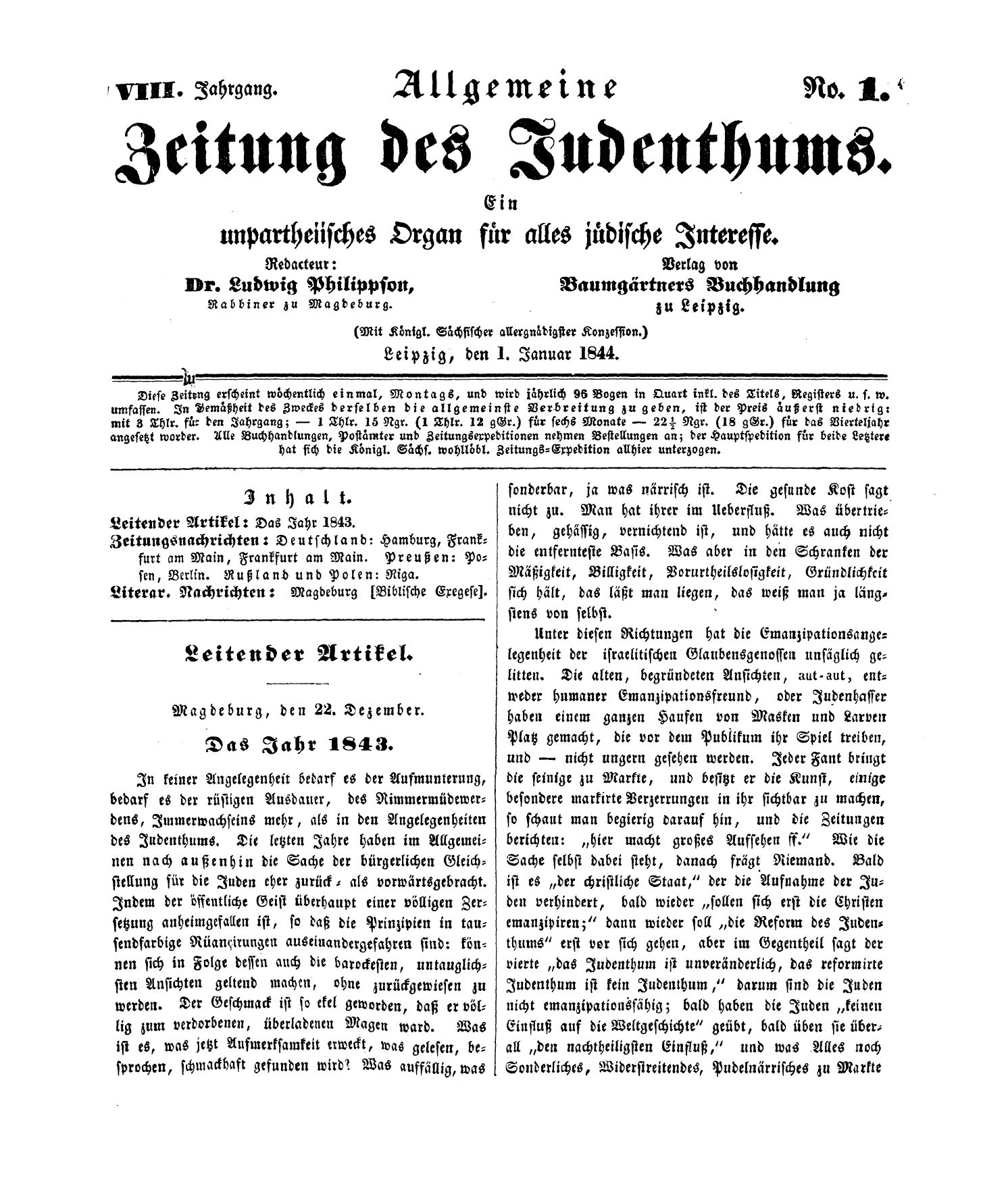
Cover of the magazine, 1 January 1844

Allgemeine Zeitung des Judentums (until May 1903: Allgemeine Zeitung des Judenthums) was a Jewish German magazine devoted to Jewish interests, founded in 1837 by Ludwig Philippson (1811–89), published first in Leipzig and later in Berlin. In 1860 it had a circulation of approximately 1,500. It was read not only in Germany, Austria, and the Netherlands but also in Eastern Europe, and continued to appear until 1922.

At the time of its founding, several Jewish journals had recently been launched in Germany – Sulamith (1806-1843), Jedidja (1817-1831), and Abraham Geiger's Wissenschaftliche Zeitschrift für Jüdische Theologie (1835-1847), as well as the Unparteiische Universal-Kirchenzeitung (1837), of Julius Vinzenz Höninghaus, which had a Jewish section edited by Michael Hess and Isaac Markus Jost – and Philippson recognized that none had kept pace with the needs of the times. He aimed to produce a journal for the intelligent lay person that would both advance knowledge of Jewish history and plead the cause of the Jews of his day.

The first number of the paper appeared May 2, 1837, and was published by Baumgärtner in Leipzig with the subtitle "Unparteiisches Organ für Alles Jüdische Interesse in Betreff von Politik, Religion, Literatur, Geschichte, Sprachkunde, und Belletristik" (Impartial Organ for All Matters of Jewish Interest Pertaining to Politics, Religion, Literature, History, Philology, and Belles-lettres). During the first two years the paper appeared three times per week. For a year and a half a supplement was published three times a month, devoted to literature and homiletics. In the course of 1839 it was first published twice weekly and then eventually became a weekly.

Isidore Singer, writing in 1906, highlighted the paper's editorial independence, noting that it had not ever received a subsidy from any Jewish body, and that during the revolutions of 1848, "when the publication of nearly all other Jewish journals was interrupted, the Allgemeine Zeitung braved the storm and spoke out plainly in the political turmoil." According to I. M. Jost, who devoted a chapter to the journal in his Neuere Geschichte der Israeliten (1847), the Allgemeine Zeitung "became epoch-making in Jewish history by attempting for the first time to give a general view of the life and conditions of the Jews."

Philippson's chief aim was the civil emancipation of the Jews, carrying on the fight for that cause in the spirit of Gabriel Riesser's earlier periodical Der Jude (1832-1835). The paper was a voice for moderate religious reform, focusing attention on the organization of religious instruction, the form of worship in the synagogue, and the cultivation of all branches of Jewish learning. It also advocated for closer relations with non-Jews. It exercised considerable influence on Judaism in general, and, in particular, on the evolution of Judaism in Germany. It played a role in the establishment of a rabbinical seminary (Lehranstalt für die Wissenschaft des Judenthums) in Berlin, and of a Jewish Publication Society (Institut zur Förderung der Israelitischen Literatur), as well as the calling together of a Jewish synod (Leipzig, 1869).

From the outset the Allgemeine Zeitung met with success, drawing the interest of cultured Jewish circles of Germany, Austria, and the Netherlands. Within the first months of its publication a society of students in Leyden (Netherlands) had formed to aid its circulation, and it even obtained several hundred subscribers in Poland.

During the first years of its existence the paper had among its collaborators a number of the most distinguished scholars, including Gabriel Riesser, E. Carmoly, J. L. Saalschütz, S. D. Luzzatto, Leopold Zunz, Leopold Dukes, Julius Fürst, Leopold Löw, Franz Delitzsch, Adolph Jellinek, Abraham Geiger, and I. M. Jost. During the first year Phoebus Philippson, brother of Ludwig, contributed a series of 11 articles under the title "Ideas for an Encyclopedia and a Methodology of Jewish Theology."

In the mid-1850s a supplement was published regularly, entitled Jüdisches Volksblatt zur Belehrung und Unterhaltung auf Jüdischem Gebiete (A Popular Jewish Journal for Instruction and Entertainment on Jewish Subjects).

After Philippson's death Gustav Karpeles assumed the editorship, beginning with the issue of February 9, 1890. Under his tenure the paper's interests shifted toward the lives and situation of the Jews of Eastern Europe. At that time a change was made in the format so that the literary part, which formed the bulk of the paper, was separated from the part containing the news. The latter was paged separately as a supplement entitled Der Gemeindebote, which continued to appear until 1922.

In 1890 the journal was acquired by Rudolf Mosse, and from then on published in Berlin.

Later, beginning in the second half of 1920, the journal appeared only once every two weeks. It ceased publication with the issue of April 28, 1922, and was succeeded by the C.V.-Zeitung (C.V.-Newspaper), the organ of the Centralverein deutscher Staatsbürger jüdischen Glaubens (Central Association of German Citizens of Jewish Faith).
