= Boustrophedon transform =

Mathematical transformation on sequences

In mathematics, the boustrophedon transform is a procedure which maps one sequence to another. The transformed sequence is computed by an "addition" operation, implemented as if filling a triangular array in a boustrophedon (zigzag- or serpentine-like) manner—as opposed to a "raster scan" sawtooth-like manner.

== Definition ==
The boustrophedon transform is a numerical, sequence-generating transformation, which is determined by a binary operation such as addition.

Figure 1. The boustrophedon transform: Start with the original sequence (in blue), then add numbers as indicated by the arrows, and finally read-off the transformed sequence on the other side (in red, with $b_0 = a_0$).

Generally speaking, given a sequence: $(a_0, a_1, a_2, \ldots)$, the boustrophedon transform yields another sequence: $(b_0, b_1, b_2, \ldots)$, where $b_0$ is likely defined equivalent to $a_0$. The entirety of the transformation itself can be visualized (or imagined) as being constructed by filling-out the triangle as shown in Figure 1.

=== Boustrophedon Triangle ===
To fill-out the numerical Isosceles triangle (Figure 1), you start with the input sequence, $(a_0, a_1, a_2, \ldots)$, and place one value (from the input sequence) per row, using the boustrophedon scan (zigzag- or serpentine-like) approach.

The top vertex of the triangle will be the input value $a_0$, equivalent to output value $b_0$, and we number this top row as row 0.

The subsequent rows (going down to the base of the triangle) are numbered consecutively (from 0) as integers—let $k$ denote the number of the row currently being filled. These rows are constructed according to the row number ($k$) as follows:

- For all rows, numbered $k \in \mathbb{N}$, there will be exactly $(k+1)$ values in the row.
- If $k$ is odd, then put the value $a_k$ on the right-hand end of the row.
  - Fill-out the interior of this row from right-to-left, where each value (index: $(k,j)$) is the result of "addition" between the value to right (index: $(k,j+1)$) and the value to the upper right (index: $(k-1,j+1)$).
  - The output value $b_k$ will be on the left-hand end of an odd row (where $k$ is odd).
- If $k$ is even, then put the input value $a_k$ on the left-hand end of the row.
  - Fill-out the interior of this row from left-to-right, where each value (index: $(k,j)$) is the result of "addition" between the value to its left (index: $(k,j-1)$) and the value to its upper left (index: $(k-1,j-1)$).
  - The output value $b_k$ will be on the right-hand end of an even row (where $k$ is even).

Refer to the arrows in Figure 1 for a visual representation of these "addition" operations.

For a given, finite input-sequence: $(a_0, a_1, ... a_N)$, of $N$ values, there will be exactly $N$ rows in the triangle, such that $k$ is an integer in the range: $[0, N)$ (exclusive). In other words, the last row is $k = N - 1$.

== Recurrence relation ==
A more formal definition uses a recurrence relation. Define the numbers $T_{k,n}$ (with k ≥ n ≥ 0) by

$$T_{k,0} = a_k$$
$$T_{k,n} = T_{k,n-1} + T_{k-1,k-n}$$
$$\text{with }$$
$$\quad k,n \in \mathbb{N}$$
$$\quad k \ge n > 0$$.

Then the transformed sequence is defined by $b_n = T_{n,n}$ (for $T_{2,2}$ and greater indices).

Per this definition, note the following definitions for values outside the restrictions (from the relationship above) on $(k,n)$ pairs:

$$\begin{align}
T_{0,0}\, \overset{\Delta}{=}& \, a_{0} \, \overset{\Delta}{=} \, b_{0}\\
\\
T_{k,0}\, \overset{\Delta}{=}& \, a_{k} \, \iff k \, \text{is even}\\
T_{k,0}\, \overset{\Delta}{=}& \, b_{k} \, \iff k \, \text{is odd}\\
\\
T_{0,k}\, \overset{\Delta}{=}& \, b_{k} \, \iff k \, \text{is even}\\
T_{0,k}\, \overset{\Delta}{=}& \, a_{k} \, \iff k \, \text{is odd}\\
\end{align}$$

=== Special Cases ===
In the case a_{0} = 1, a_{n} = 0 (n > 0), the resulting triangle is called the Seidel–Entringer–Arnold Triangle and the numbers $T_{k,n}$ are called Entringer numbers (sequence A008281 in the OEIS).

In this case the numbers in the transformed sequence b_{n} are called the Euler up/down numbers. This is sequence A000111 on the On-Line Encyclopedia of Integer Sequences. These enumerate the number of alternating permutations on n letters and are related to the Euler numbers and the Bernoulli numbers.

== Algebraic definition(s) ==
Building from the geometric design of the boustrophedon transform, algebraic definitions of the relationship from input values ($a_i$) to output values ($b_i$) can be defined for different algebras ("numeric domains").

=== Euclidean (Real) values ===
In the Euclidean ($\mathbb{E}^{n}$) Algebra for Real ($\mathbb{R}^{1}$)-valued scalars, the boustrophedon transformed Real-value (b_{n}) is related to the input value, (a_{n}), as:

$$\begin{align}
b_n &= \sum_{k=0}^n \binom{n}{k} a_k E_{n-k} \\
\end{align}$$,

with the reverse relationship (input from output) defined as:

$$\begin{align}
a_n &= \sum_{k=0}^n (-1)^{n-k} \binom{n}{k} b_k E_{n-k}
\end{align}$$,

where (E_{n}) is the sequence of "up/down" numbers—also known as secant or tangent numbers.

== The exponential generating function ==
The exponential generating function of a sequence (a_{n}) is defined by

$$EG(a_n;x)=\sum _{n=0}^{\infty} a_n \frac{x^n}{n!}.$$

The exponential generating function of the boustrophedon transform (b_{n}) is related to that of the original sequence (a_{n}) by

$$EG(b_n;x) = (\sec x + \tan x) \, EG(a_n;x).$$

The exponential generating function of the unit sequence is 1, so that of the up/down numbers is sec x + tan x.
