= Poly-Bernoulli number =

Integer sequence

In mathematics, poly-Bernoulli numbers, denoted as $B_{n}^{(k)}$ is an integer sequence.

== Definition ==
It was defined by Kaneko as:

$${Li_{k}(1-e^{-x}) \over 1-e^{-x}}=\sum_{n=0}^{\infty}B_{n}^{(k)}{x^{n}\over n!}$$

where Li is the polylogarithm. The $B_{n}^{(1)}$ are the usual Bernoulli numbers.

Moreover, the Generalization of Poly-Bernoulli numbers with a,b,c parameters defined as follows

$${Li_{k}(1-(ab)^{-x})\over b^x-a^{-x}}c^{xt}=\sum_{n=0}^{\infty}B_{n}^{(k)}(t;a,b,c){x^{n}\over n!}$$

where Li is the polylogarithm.

== Combinatorial interpretation ==
Kaneko also gave two combinatorial formulas:

$$B_{n}^{(-k)}=\sum_{m=0}^{n}(-1)^{m+n}m!S(n,m)(m+1)^{k},$$

$$B_{n}^{(-k)}=\sum_{j=0}^{\min(n,k)} (j!)^{2}S(n+1,j+1)S(k+1,j+1),$$

where $S(n,k)$ is the number of ways to partition a size $n$ set into $k$ non-empty subsets (the Stirling number of the second kind).

A combinatorial interpretation is that the poly-Bernoulli numbers of negative index enumerate the set of $n$ by $k$ (0,1)-matrices uniquely reconstructible from their row and column sums. Also it is the number of open tours by a biased rook on a board $\underbrace{1\cdots1}_{n}\underbrace{0\cdots0}_{k}$ (see A329718 for definition).

The Poly-Bernoulli number $B_{k}^{(-k)}$ satisfies the following asymptotic:

$B_{k}^{(-k)} \sim (k!)^2 \sqrt{\frac{1}{k\pi(1-\log 2)}}\left( \frac{1}{\log 2} \right) ^{2k+1}, \quad \text{as } k \rightarrow \infty.$

For a positive integer n and a prime number p, the poly-Bernoulli numbers satisfy

$$B_n^{(-p)} \equiv 2^n \pmod p,$$

which can be seen as an analog of Fermat's little theorem. Further, the equation

$$B_x^{(-n)} + B_y^{(-n)} = B_z^{(-n)}$$

has no solution for integers x, y, z, n > 2; an analog of Fermat's Last Theorem. Moreover, there is an analogue of Poly-Bernoulli numbers (like Bernoulli numbers and Euler numbers) which is known as Poly-Euler numbers.

== See also ==
- Bernoulli numbers
- Stirling numbers
- Gregory coefficients
- Bernoulli polynomials
- Bernoulli polynomials of the second kind
- Stirling polynomials
