= Louis Saalschütz =

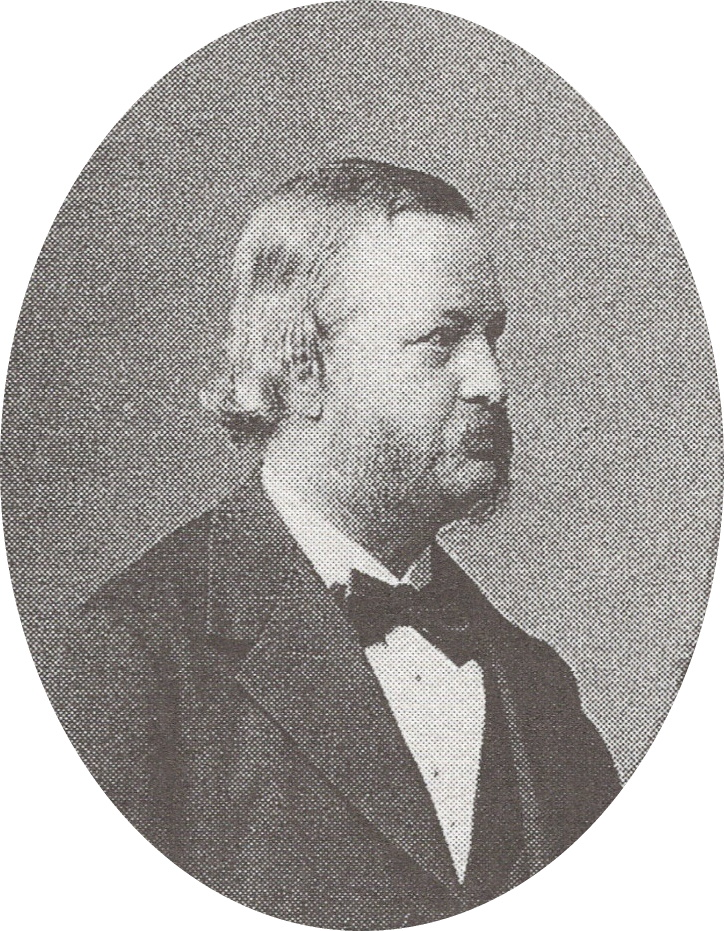
Louis Saalschütz's Portrait

Louis Saalschütz (1 December 1835 — 25 May 1913) was a Prussian-Jewish mathematician, known for his contributions to number theory and mathematical analysis.

== Biography ==
Louis Saalschütz was born to a Jewish family in Königsberg, Prussia, the son of archaeologist Joseph Levin Saalschütz. From 1854 to 1860 he studied mathematics and physics at the University of Königsberg. In 1861 he received his doctorate under the supervision of Franz Ernst Neumann, with the dissertation Ueber die Wärmeveränderungen in den Höheren Erdschichten Unter dem Einfluss des Nicht-periodischen Temperaturwechsels an der Oberfläche.

From 1861 to 1882 he was teacher of mathematics, mechanics, and engineering at the Royal School of Mechanics in Königsberg and the University of Königsberg, where he became an associate professor in 1875 and full professor in 1888.

== Hypergeometric Series ==
F. J. Whipple coined the phrase "Saalschützian" for generalized hypergeometric $_3F_2$ series where one of the numerator parameters is a negative integer and the sum of the denominator parameters is one plus the sum of the numerator parameters. Nowadays it is also used for more general $_{p+1}F_p$ series with that property.

The "Saalschutz theorem" is

$_3F_2(a,b,-n;c,1+a+b-c-n;1) = \frac{(c-a)_n(c-b)_n}{(c)_n(c-a-b)_n}.$
