= Angelo Genocchi =

Italian mathematician (1817–1889)

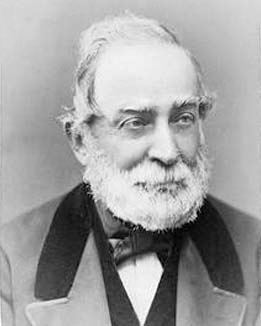
- Born: 5 March 1817; Piacenza, Duchy of Parma and Piacenza
- Died: 7 March 1889 (aged 72); Turin, Kingdom of Italy
- Known for: Genocchi numbers
- Scientific career
- Fields: Mathematics

Angelo Genocchi (5 March 1817 – 7 March 1889) was an Italian mathematician who specialized in number theory. He worked with Giuseppe Peano. The Genocchi numbers are named after him.

== Life and Works ==
Angelo Genocchi was born and grew up in Piacenza, and went to school there. Despite his love of mathematics, he studied law at Piacenza University. After practicing law in Piacenza for a number of years, he was invited by the university to become the Chair of Law. He was mostly unsuccessful as a teacher, however, and disliked by many of his students.

Angelo Genocchi was part of a group that participated in the attempted overthrow of the Austro-Hungarian government in Piacenza. The revolution was unsuccessful.

After the revolution, Genocchi moved to Turin, where he took up mathematics as the subject of his research and teaching. He became President of the Academy of Sciences of Turin. It was there that he worked with Giuseppe Peano.

After years of ill health, he died in 1889, aged 72.
