= Alternating permutation =

Type of permutation

In combinatorial mathematics, an alternating permutation (or zigzag permutation) of the set {1, 2, 3, ..., n} is a permutation (arrangement) of those numbers so that each entry is alternately greater or less than the preceding entry. For example, the five alternating permutations of {1, 2, 3, 4} are:

- 1, 3, 2, 4 because 1 < 3 > 2 < 4,
- 1, 4, 2, 3 because 1 < 4 > 2 < 3,
- 2, 3, 1, 4 because 2 < 3 > 1 < 4,
- 2, 4, 1, 3 because 2 < 4 > 1 < 3, and
- 3, 4, 1, 2 because 3 < 4 > 1 < 2.

This type of permutation was first studied by Désiré André in the 19th century.

Different authors use the term alternating permutation slightly differently: some require that the second entry in an alternating permutation should be larger than the first (as in the examples above), others require that the alternation should be reversed (so that the second entry is smaller than the first, then the third larger than the second, and so on), while others call both types by the name alternating permutation.

The determination of the number A_{n} of alternating permutations of the set {1, ..., n} is called André's problem. The numbers A_{n} are known as Euler numbers, zigzag numbers, or up/down numbers. When n is even the number A_{n} is known as a secant number, while if n is odd it is known as a tangent number. These latter names come from the study of the generating function for the sequence.

== Definitions ==
A permutation c_{1}, ..., c_{n} is said to be alternating if its entries alternately rise and descend. Thus, each entry other than the first and the last should be either larger or smaller than both of its neighbors. Some authors use the term alternating to refer only to the "up-down" permutations for which c_{1} < c_{2} > c_{3} < ..., calling the "down-up" permutations that satisfy c_{1} > c_{2} < c_{3} > ... by the name reverse alternating. Other authors reverse this convention, or use the word "alternating" to refer to both up-down and down-up permutations.

There is a simple one-to-one correspondence between the down-up and up-down permutations: replacing each entry c_{i} with n + 1 - c_{i} reverses the relative order of the entries.

By convention, in any naming scheme the unique permutations of length 0 (the permutation of the empty set) and 1 (the permutation consisting of a single entry 1) are taken to be alternating.

== André's theorem ==
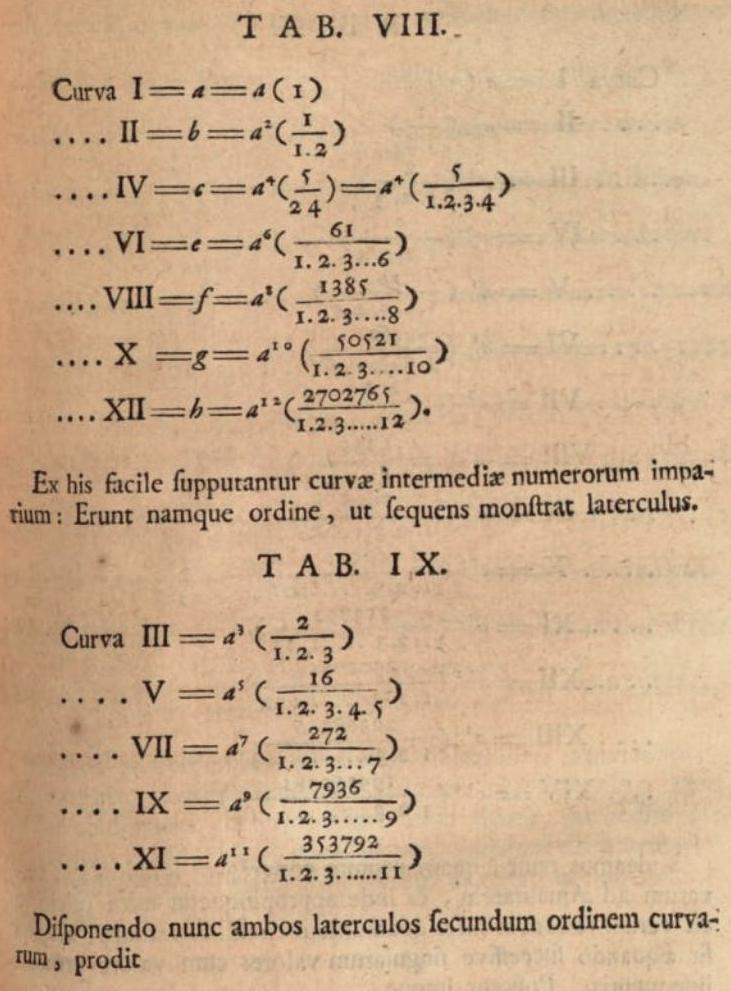
The zigzag numbers in Bernoulli (1742), Opera Omnia vol. 4, p. 105

The determination of the number A_{n} of alternating permutations of the set {1, ..., n} is called André's problem. The numbers A_{n} are variously known as Euler numbers, zigzag numbers, up/down numbers, or by some combinations of these names. The name Euler numbers in particular is sometimes used for a closely related sequence. The first few values of A_{n} are 1, 1, 1, 2, 5, 16, 61, 272, 1385, 7936, 50521, ... (sequence A000111 in the OEIS).

These numbers satisfy a simple recurrence, similar to that of the Catalan numbers: by splitting the set of alternating permutations (both down-up and up-down) of the set { 1, 2, 3, ..., n, n + 1 } according to the position k of the largest entry n + 1, one can show that

$$2A_{n+1} = \sum_{k=0}^n \binom{n}{k} A_k A_{n-k}$$

for all n ≥ 1. André (1881) used this recurrence to give a differential equation satisfied by the exponential generating function

$$A(x) = \sum_{n=0}^\infty A_n \frac{x^n}{n!}$$

for the sequence A_{n}. In fact, the recurrence gives:

$$2\sum_{n\geq 1} A_{n+1} \frac{x^{n+1}}{(n+1)!}
= \sum_{n\geq 1} \sum_{k=0}^n \frac{A_k}{k!} \frac{A_{n-k}}{(n-k)!} \frac{x^{n+1}}{n+1}
= \int \left(\sum_{k\geq 0}A_k \frac{x^k}{k!}\right) \left(\sum_{j\geq 0}A_j \frac{x^j}{j!}\right) \, dx - x$$

where we substitute $j = n-k$ and $\frac{x^{n+1}}{n+1}=\int x^{k+j}\,dx$. This gives the integral equation

$$2(A(x) - 1 - x) = \int A(x)^2\,dx - x,$$

which after differentiation becomes $2\frac{dA}{dx} - 2 = A^2-1$. This differential equation can be solved by separation of variables (using the initial condition $A(0)=A_0/0!=1$), and simplified using a tangent half-angle formula, giving the final result

$$A(x) = \tan \left(\frac\pi4 + \frac x2\right) = \sec x + \tan x$$,

the sum of the secant and tangent functions. This result is known as André's theorem. A geometric interpretation of this result can be given using a generalization of a theorem by Johann Bernoulli.

It follows from André's theorem that the radius of convergence of the series A(x) is π/2. This allows one to compute the asymptotic expansion

$$A_n \sim 2 \left(\frac{2}{\pi}\right)^{n + 1} n!\,.$$

== Seidel's Algorithm ==
In 1877 Philipp Ludwig von Seidel published an algorithm, which makes it simple to calculate A_{n}.

$\begin{array}{crrrcc} { } & { } & {\color{red}1} & { } & { } & { } \\ { } & {\rightarrow} & {\color{blue}1} & {\color{red}1} & { } \\ { } & {\color{red}2} & {\color{blue}2} & {\color{blue}1} & {\leftarrow} \\ {\rightarrow} & {\color{blue}2} & {\color{blue}4} & {\color{blue}5} & {\color{red}5} \\ {\color{red}16} & {\color{blue}16} & {\color{blue}14} & {\color{blue}10} & {\color{blue}5} & {\leftarrow} \end{array}$
Seidel's algorithm for A_{n}
1. Start by putting 1 in row 0 and let k denote the number of the row currently being filled
2. If k is odd, then put the number on the left end of the row k − 1 in the first position of the row k, and fill the row from the left to the right, with every entry being the sum of the number to the left and the number to the upper
3. At the end of the row duplicate the last number.
4. If k is even, proceed similar in the other direction.

Seidel's algorithm is in fact much more general (see the exposition of Dominique Dumont) and was rediscovered several times thereafter.

Similar to Seidel's approach D. E. Knuth and T. J. Buckholtz gave a recurrence equation for the numbers A_{2n} and recommended this method for computing the Bernoulli numbers B_{2n} and Euler numbers E_{2n} 'on electronic computers using only simple operations on integers'.

V. I. Arnold rediscovered Seidel's algorithm and later Millar, Sloane and Young popularized Seidel's algorithm under the name boustrophedon transform.

Triangular form:

						1
					1		1
				2		2		1
			2		4		5		5
		16		16		14		10		5
	16		32		46		56		61		61
272		272		256		224		178		122		61

Only OEIS: A000657, with one 1, and OEIS: A214267, with two 1s, are in the OEIS.

Distribution with a supplementary 1 and one 0 in the following rows:

						1
					0		1
				−1		−1		0
			0		−1		−2		−2
		5		5		4		2		0
	0		5		10		14		16		16
−61		−61		−56		−46		−32		−16		0

This is OEIS: A239005, a signed version of OEIS: A008280. The main andiagonal is OEIS: A122045. The main diagonal is OEIS: A155585. The central column is OEIS: A099023. Row sums: 1, 1, −2, −5, 16, 61.... See OEIS: A163747. See the array beginning with 1, 1, 0, −2, 0, 16, 0 below.

The Akiyama–Tanigawa algorithm applied to OEIS: A046978 (n + 1) / OEIS: A016116(n) yields:

1	1	1/2	0	−1/4	−1/4	−1/8
0	1	3/2	1	0	−3/4
−1	−1	3/2	4	15/4
0	−5	−15/2	1
5	5	−51/2
0	61
−61

1. The first column is OEIS: A122045. Its binomial transform leads to:

1	1	0	−2	0	16	0
0	−1	−2	2	16	−16
−1	−1	4	14	−32
0	5	10	−46
5	5	−56
0	−61
−61

The first row of this array is OEIS: A155585. The absolute values of the increasing antidiagonals are OEIS: A008280. The sum of the antidiagonals is −OEIS: A163747 (n + 1).

2. The second column is 1 1 −1 −5 5 61 −61 −1385 1385.... Its binomial transform yields:

1	2	2	−4	−16	32	272
1	0	−6	−12	48	240
−1	−6	−6	60	192
−5	0	66	32
5	66	66
61	0
−61

The first row of this array is 1 2 2 −4 −16 32 272 544 −7936 15872 353792 −707584.... The absolute values of the second bisection are the double of the absolute values of the first bisection.

Consider the Akiyama-Tanigawa algorithm applied to OEIS: A046978 (n) / (OEIS: A158780 (n + 1) = abs(OEIS: A117575 (n)) + 1 = 1, 2, 2, 3/2, 1, 3/4, 3/4, 7/8, 1, 17/16, 17/16, 33/32....

1	2	2	3/2	1	3/4	3/4
−1	0	3/2	2	5/4	0
−1	−3	−3/2	3	25/4
2	−3	−27/2	−13
5	21	−3/2
−16	45
−61

The first column whose the absolute values are OEIS: A000111 could be the numerator of a trigonometric function.

OEIS: A163747 is an autosequence of the first kind (the main diagonal is OEIS: A000004). The corresponding array is:

0	−1	−1	2	5	−16	−61
−1	0	3	3	−21	−45
1	3	0	−24	−24
2	−3	−24	0
−5	−21	24
−16	45
−61

The first two upper diagonals are −1 3 −24 402... = (−1)^{n + 1} × OEIS: A002832. The sum of the antidiagonals is 0 −2 0 10... = 2 × OEIS: A122045(n + 1).

−OEIS: A163982 is an autosequence of the second kind, like for instance OEIS: A164555 / OEIS: A027642. Hence the array:

2	1	−1	−2	5	16	−61
−1	−2	−1	7	11	−77
−1	1	8	4	−88
2	7	−4	−92
5	−11	−88
−16	−77
−61

The main diagonal, here 2 −2 8 −92..., is the double of the first upper one, here OEIS: A099023. The sum of the antidiagonals is 2 0 −4 0... = 2 × OEIS: A155585(n + 1). OEIS: A163747 − OEIS: A163982 = 2 × OEIS: A122045.

== Related sequences ==
The odd-indexed zigzag numbers (i.e., the tangent numbers) are closely related to Bernoulli numbers. The relation is given by the formula

$$B_{2n} =(-1)^{n-1}\frac{2n}{4^{2n}-2^{2n}} A_{2n-1}$$

for n > 0.

If Z_{n} denotes the number of permutations of {1, ..., n} that are either up-down or down-up (or both, for n < 2) then it follows from the pairing given above that Z_{n} = 2A_{n} for n ≥ 2. The first few values of Z_{n} are 1, 1, 2, 4, 10, 32, 122, 544, 2770, 15872, 101042, ... (sequence A001250 in the OEIS).

The Euler zigzag numbers are related to Entringer numbers, from which the zigzag numbers may be computed. The Entringer numbers can be defined recursively as follows:

$$E(0,0) = 1$$
$$E(n,0) = 0 \qquad \mbox{for } n > 0$$
$$E(n,k) = E(n, k-1) + E(n-1, n-k)$$.

The n^{th} zigzag number is equal to the Entringer number E(n, n).

The numbers A_{2n} with even indices are called secant numbers or zig numbers: since the secant function is even and tangent is odd, it follows from André's theorem above that they are the numerators in the Maclaurin series of sec x. The first few values are 1, 1, 5, 61, 1385, 50521, ... (sequence A000364 in the OEIS).

Secant numbers are related to the signed Euler numbers (Taylor coefficients of hyperbolic secant) by the formula E_{2n} = (−1)^{n}A_{2n}. (E_{n} = 0 when n is odd.)

Correspondingly, the numbers A_{2n+1} with odd indices are called tangent numbers or zag numbers. The first few values are 1, 2, 16, 272, 7936, ... (sequence A000182 in the OEIS).

== Explicit formula in terms of Stirling numbers of the second kind ==
The relationships of Euler zigzag numbers with the Euler numbers, and the Bernoulli numbers can be used to prove the following

$$A_{r}=-\frac{4^{r}}{a_{r}} \sum_{k=1}^{r}\frac{(-1)^{k}\, S(r,k)}{k+1}\left(\frac{3}{4}\right)^{(k)}$$

where

$$a_{r}=\begin{cases} (-1)^{\frac{r-1}{2}}(1+2^{-r}) &\mbox{if r is odd} \\
(-1)^{\frac{r}{2}} & \mbox{if r is even} \end{cases},$$

$(x)^{(n)}=(x)(x+1)\cdots (x+n-1)$ denotes the rising factorial, and $S(r,k)$ denotes Stirling numbers of the second kind.

== See also ==
- Longest alternating subsequence
- Boustrophedon transform
- Fence (mathematics), a partially ordered set that has alternating permutations as its linear extensions
