= Joseph Levin Saalschütz =

- Born: March 15, 1801; Königsberg, East Prussia
- Died: August 23, 1863 (aged 62)

Academic background
- Education: University of Königsberg
- Thesis: (1824)

Joseph Levin Saalschütz (March 15, 1801 – August 23, 1863) was a German rabbi, archaeologist, and anthropologist.

== Biography ==
Joseph Levin Saalschütz was born in Königsberg, East Prussia, in 1801. He was educated at the local gymnasium and at the University of Königsberg. In 1824, he became the first Jew to obtain a Ph.D. from that institution.

Throughout his career, Saalschütz held several positions as a rabbi and teacher at Jewish communal schools in Berlin and Vienna. He returned to Königsberg in 1835, where he served as a rabbi and, in 1847, became Privatdozent in Hebrew archaeology at the University of Königsberg.

Despite his many academic achievements, he failed to advance from this position to a professorship. He died as a Privatdozent on August 23, 1863.

== Selected publications ==
- Von der Form der Hebräischen Poesie Nebst einer Abhandlung über die Musik der Hebräer. Königsberg: A. W. Unzer. 1825. Re-edited in 1853 under the title Form und Geist der Biblisch-Hebräischen Poesie.
- Geschichte und Würdigung der Musik bei den Hebräern Nebst einem Anhang über die Hebräische Orgel. Berlin: G. Fincke. 1829.
- Grundlage zu katechisationen über die israelitische Gotteslehre. Vienna: C. Gerold. 1833. A book on Jewish religion widely used in schools in Austria and Hungary.
- Forschungen im Gebiete der Hebräisch-Aegyptischen Archäologie. Königsberg. 1838.
- Die Versöhnung der Confessionen, oder Judenthum und Christenthum in Ihrem Streit und Einklange. Königsberg. 1844.
- Vocabularium zum Hebräischen Gebetbuche. With supplement.
- Einleitung in die Hebräische Grammatik. Königsberg. 1844.
- Das mosaische recht, mit Berücksichtigung des spätern Jüdischen. Berlin: Carl Heymann. 1848.
- Das Königthum vom Israelitisch-Bi blischen Standpunkte. 1852.
- Zur Geschichte der Unsterblichkeitslehre bei den Hebräern. 1853.
- Archäologie der Hebräer. Königsberg. 1855–1856. A comprehensive survey of various topics from a Jewish standpoint, including dress, home, religion, art, literature, and government.
- Repetitionsbüchlein der Israelitischen Religion und Sittenlehre.
- Gebetbuch der Synagoge. 1859.
