= Euler number =

Integers occurring in the coefficients of the Taylor series of 1/cosh t

In mathematics, the Euler numbers are a sequence E_{n} of integers (sequence A122045 in the OEIS) defined by the Taylor series expansion
$$\frac{1}{\cosh t} = \frac{2}{e^{t} + e^ {-t} } = \sum_{n=0}^\infty  E_n \frac{t^n}{n!},$$
where $\cosh (t)$ is the hyperbolic cosine function. The Euler numbers are related to a special value of the Euler polynomials, written here as e_{n}(t) so that they are not confused with the Euler numbers,
$$E_n=2^ne_n(\tfrac 12).$$

The Euler numbers appear in the Taylor series expansions of the secant and hyperbolic secant functions. The latter is the function in the definition. They also occur in combinatorics, specifically when counting the number of alternating permutations of a set with an even number of elements.

== Examples ==
The odd-indexed Euler numbers are all zero. The even-indexed ones (sequence A028296 in the OEIS) have alternating signs. Some values are:

E_{0}	=	1
E_{2}	=	−1
E_{4}	=	5
E_{6}	=	−61
E_{8}	=	1385
E_{10}	=	−50521
E_{12}	=	2702765
E_{14}	=	−199360981
E_{16}	=	19391512145
E_{18}	=	−2404879675441

Some authors re-index the sequence in order to omit the odd-numbered Euler numbers with value zero, or change all signs to positive (sequence A000364 in the OEIS). This article adheres to the convention adopted above.

== Explicit formulas ==
=== In terms of Stirling numbers of the second kind ===
The following two formulas express the Euler numbers in terms of Stirling numbers of the second kind:

$$E_{n}=2^{2n-1}\sum_{\ell=1}^{n}\frac{(-1)^{\ell}S(n,\ell)}{\ell+1}\left(3\left(\frac{1}{4}\right)^{\overline{\ell\phantom{.}}}-\left(\frac{3}{4}\right)^{\overline{\ell\phantom{.}}}\right),$$
$$E_{2n}=-4^{2n}\sum_{\ell=1}^{2n}(-1)^{\ell}\cdot \frac{S(2n,\ell)}{\ell+1}\cdot \left(\frac{3}{4}\right)^{\overline{\ell\phantom{.}}},$$

where $S(n,\ell)$ denotes the Stirling numbers of the second kind, and $x^{\overline{\ell\phantom{.}}}=(x)(x+1)\cdots (x+\ell-1)$ denotes the rising factorial.

=== As a recursion ===
For n > 0, the Euler numbers can be defined by the recursion

$$E_{2n}=-\sum_{{k=1}}^{n}\binom{2n}{2k}E_{2(n-k)},$$

or equivalently

$$0=\sum_{{k=0}}^{n}\binom{2n}{2k}E_{2k}.$$

These recursions can be found from interpreting

$$\cosh(x)\operatorname{sech}(x)=1$$

as an equation of exponential generating functions.

=== As a double sum ===
The following two formulas express the Euler numbers as double sums

$$E_{2n}=(2 n+1)\sum_{\ell=0}^{2n} (-1)^{\ell}\frac{1}{2^{\ell}(\ell +1)}\binom{2 n}{\ell}\sum _{q=0}^{\ell}\binom{\ell}{q}(2q-\ell)^{2n},$$
$$E_{2n}=\sum_{k=0}^{2n}(-1)^{k} \frac{1}{2^{k}}\sum_{\ell=0}^{2k}(-1)^{\ell } \binom{2k}{\ell}(k-\ell)^{2n}.$$

=== As an iterated sum ===
An explicit formula for Euler numbers is

$$E_{2n}=i\sum _{k=1}^{2n+1} \sum _{\ell=0}^k \binom{k}{\ell}\frac{(-1)^\ell(k-2\ell)^{2n+1}}{2^k i^k k},$$

where i denotes the imaginary unit with i^{2} = −1.

=== As a sum over partitions ===
The Euler number E_{2n} can be expressed as a sum over the even partitions of 2n,

$$E_{2n} = (2n)! \sum_{0 \leq k_1, \ldots, k_n \leq n} \binom K {k_1, \ldots , k_n}
\delta_{n,\sum mk_m}  \left( -\frac{1}{2!} \right)^{k_1} \left( -\frac{1}{4!} \right)^{k_2}
\cdots \left( -\frac{1}{(2n)!} \right)^{k_n} ,$$

as well as a sum over the odd partitions of 2n − 1,

$$E_{2n} =  (-1)^{n-1} (2n-1)! \sum_{0 \leq k_1, \ldots, k_n \leq 2n-1}
\binom K {k_1, \ldots , k_n}
\delta_{2n-1,\sum (2m-1)k_m }   \left( -\frac{1}{1!} \right)^{k_1}  \left( \frac{1}{3!} \right)^{k_2}
\cdots \left( \frac{(-1)^n}{(2n-1)!} \right)^{k_n}   ,$$

where in both cases K = k_{1} + ··· + k_{n} and

$$\binom K {k_1, \ldots , k_n}
\equiv \frac{ K!}{k_1! \cdots k_n!}$$

is a multinomial coefficient. The Kronecker deltas in the above formulas restrict the sums over the ks to 2k_{1} + 4k_{2} + ··· + 2nk_{n} = 2n and to k_{1} + 3k_{2} + ··· + (2n − 1)k_{n} = 2n − 1, respectively.

As an example,

$$\begin{align}
E_{10} & = 10! \left( - \frac{1}{10!} + \frac{2}{2!\,8!} + \frac{2}{4!\,6!}
- \frac{3}{2!^2\, 6!}- \frac{3}{2!\,4!^2} +\frac{4}{2!^3\, 4!} - \frac{1}{2!^5}\right) \\[6pt]
& = 9! \left( - \frac{1}{9!} + \frac{3}{1!^2\,7!} + \frac{6}{1!\,3!\,5!}
+\frac{1}{3!^3}- \frac{5}{1!^4\,5!} -\frac{10}{1!^3\,3!^2} + \frac{7}{1!^6\, 3!} - \frac{1}{1!^9}\right) \\[6pt]
& = -50\,521.
\end{align}$$

=== As a determinant ===
E_{2n} is given by the determinant

$$\begin{align}
E_{2n} &=(-1)^n (2n)!~ \begin{vmatrix}   \frac{1}{2!}& 1 &~& ~&~\\
\frac{1}{4!}&  \frac{1}{2!} & 1 &~&~\\
\vdots & ~  &  \ddots~~ &\ddots~~ & ~\\
\frac{1}{(2n-2)!}& \frac{1}{(2n-4)!}& ~&\frac{1}{2!} &  1\\
\frac{1}{(2n)!}&\frac{1}{(2n-2)!}& \cdots &  \frac{1}{4!} & \frac{1}{2!}\end{vmatrix}.
\end{align}$$

=== As an integral ===
E_{2n} is also given by the following integrals:

$$\begin{align}
(-1)^n E_{2n} & = \int_0^\infty \frac{t^{2n}}{\cosh\frac{\pi t}2}\; dt =\left(\frac2\pi\right)^{2n+1} \int_0^\infty \frac{x^{2n}}{\cosh x}\; dx\\[8pt]
&=\left(\frac2\pi\right)^{2n} \int_0^1\log^{2n}\left(\tan \frac{\pi t}{4} \right)\,dt =\left(\frac2\pi\right)^{2n+1}\int_0^{\pi/2} \log^{2n}\left(\tan \frac{x}{2} \right)\,dx\\[8pt]
&= \frac{2^{2n+3}}{\pi^{2n+2}} \int_0^{\pi/2} x \log^{2n} (\tan x)\,dx = \left(\frac2\pi\right)^{2n+2} \int_0^\pi \frac{x}{2} \log^{2n} \left(\tan \frac{x}{2} \right)\,dx.\end{align}$$

== Congruences ==
W. Zhang obtained the following combinational identities concerning the Euler numbers. For any prime $p$, we have

$$(-1)^{\frac{p-1}{2}} E_{p-1} \equiv \textstyle\begin{cases} \phantom{-} 0 \mod p &\text{if }p\equiv 1\bmod 4; \\ -2 \mod p & \text{if }p\equiv 3\bmod 4. \end{cases}$$

W. Zhang and Z. Xu proved that, for any prime $p \equiv 1 \pmod{4}$ and integer $\alpha\geq 1$, we have

$$E_{\phi(p^{\alpha})/2}\not \equiv 0 \pmod{p^{\alpha}},$$

where $\phi(n)$ is the Euler's totient function.

== Lower bound ==
The Euler numbers grow quite rapidly for large indices, as they have the lower bound

$$|E_{2 n}| > 8 \sqrt { \frac{n}{\pi} } \left(\frac{4 n}{ \pi e}\right)^{2 n}.$$

== Euler zigzag numbers ==
The Taylor series of $\sec x + \tan x = \tan\left(\frac\pi4 + \frac x2\right)$ is

$$\sum_{n=0}^{\infty} A_n \frac{x^n}{n!},$$

where A_{n} is the Euler zigzag numbers, beginning with

1, 1, 1, 2, 5, 16, 61, 272, 1385, 7936, 50521, 353792, 2702765, 22368256, 199360981, 1903757312, 19391512145, 209865342976, 2404879675441, 29088885112832, ... (sequence A000111 in the OEIS)

For all even n,

$$A_n = (-1)^\frac{n}{2} E_n,$$

where E_{n} is the Euler number, and for all odd n,

$$A_n = (-1)^\frac{n-1}{2}\frac{2^{n+1}\left(2^{n+1}-1\right)B_{n+1}}{n+1},$$

where B_{n} is the Bernoulli number.

For every n,

$\frac{A_{n-1}}{(n-1)!}\sin{\left(\frac{n\pi}{2}\right)}+\sum_{m=0}^{n-1}\frac{A_m}{m!(n-m-1)!}\sin{\left(\frac{m\pi}{2}\right)}=\frac{1}{(n-1)!}.$

== See also ==
- Bell number
- Bernoulli number
- Dirichlet beta function
- Euler–Mascheroni constant
- List of topics named after Leonhard Euler
