= List of things named after George Airy =

This is a list of things named after George Biddell Airy, a nineteenth-century English mathematician and astronomer.

== Mathematics and related physics concepts ==
- Airy beam
- Airy condition
- Airy disc
- Airy distribution
- Airy differential equation
  - Airy functions Ai(x) and Bi(x)
- Airy points.
- Airy stress functions
- Airy transform
- Airy wave theory.
- Airy zeta function

== Astronomy and geosciences ==
- Airy–Heiskanen model, see "Airy hypothesis".
- Airy, a crater on Mars.
  - Airy-0, another smaller crater, whose location within Airy, defines the prime meridian of that planet.
- Airy (lunar crater) named in his honour.
- Airy ellipsoid
- Airy hypothesis
- Airy Mean Time
- Airy projection
- Airy Transit Circle
