= Score function =

The term score function may refer to:

- Scoring rule, in decision theory, measures the accuracy of probabilistic predictions
- Score (statistics), the derivative of the log-likelihood function with respect to the parameter
- In positional voting, a function mapping the rank of a candidate to the number of points this candidate receives.

== See also ==
- Scorer's function
