= Jerome V. Moloney =

Irish-American optical scientist and mathematician

- Born: February 14, 1948 (age 78); Clonakilty, Co. Cork, Ireland
- Citizenship: American and Irish
- Education: B.SC University College Cork 1970; Ph.D University of Western Ontario 1976
- Occupations: Professor of optical sciences and mathematics; Owner: Nonlinear Control Strategies Inc
- Spouse: Tracy L Thomas
- Children: Kevin and Martin Moloney
- Parents: Michael Moloney (father); Brigid O’Rourke (mother)
- Website: www.acms.arizona.edu; www.nlcstr.com

Jerome V. Moloney is an Irish-American professor of optical sciences and mathematics at the University of Arizona and serves as the director of the Arizona Center for Mathematical Sciences.

== Biography ==
Moloney earned his B.Sc. degree from University College Cork, Ireland, in 1970, and completed his Ph.D. at the University of Western Ontario, Canada, in 1976. From 1977 to 1979, he served as a research associate in physics at Universität Bielefeld in Bielefeld, Germany.

In 1979, he joined the Optical Sciences Center, University of Arizona, as a research associate. From 1981 until 1984 he was a research assistant and associate professor in optical sciences at the University of Arizona. In 1984, he became a reader in physics at Heriot-Watt University, till 1990. In 1990, he was appointed a full professor at the University of Arizona and became the director of the Arizona Center for Mathematical Sciences the same year.

== Main research topics ==
Moloney's research interests cover multiple topics in large-scale physics simulations, applied mathematics, photonics, and nonlinear optics fields. He, with colleagues at Arizona, suggested that the reason for the non-spreading propagation of X waves found by Di Trapani's was due to the interplay of Kerr nonlinearity and chromatic dispersion, and later, that optical carrier shock waves strongly influence long wavelength laser pulses propagating in the atmosphere.

Moloney proposed the “Airy beam” to create a new method for guiding laser light. Combining an Airy beam with a high-intensity pulse beam, Moloney's team created curved plasma channels. By using the lens, these channels can be bent or straightened. The phenomenon propagated to ultra-intense self-bending Airy beams in transparent dielectric media.

Moloney in 1999–2000, with colleagues at the University of Arizona as described in Optics Letters and Physical Review Letters, proposed and described a mechanism whereby multiple light filaments created by high-power lasers in the atmosphere could be sustained over long distances, a mechanism critical to the generation of laser lightning rods. The latter concept was further developed with colleagues from the University of Central Florida, described in Nature Photonics, and was recently implemented in a field experiment to divert lightning strikes away from buildings and populated areas.

Moloney, with the collaboration of a team of US and German researchers, established a rigorous theoretical foundation to describe how semiconductor lasers operate, transitioning this knowledge to the development of commercial semiconductor epitaxy design software for lasers and sensors. The team designed a series of continuous, room-temperature, vertical-external-cavity semiconductor laser sources (VECSEL) that deliver narrowband, milliwatt beams at terahertz-gap frequencies and a yellow laser wavelength for guidestar applications. Their devices incorporate a nonlinear optics element into the external-cavity laser. Moloney and his coworkers generated a narrowband emission at the uppermost frequencies of the terahertz gap and at the laser guidestar (yellow) wavelengths by mixing two IR beams. He proposed visible light VECSELs as practical compact Guidestar laser sources and recognized the potential of room temperature, tunable terahertz external-cavity surface-emitting lasers (TECSELs) as a practical technology for astronomical observations.

== Selected publications ==
- (2012) Heterodyne Detection of Intracavity Generated Terahertz Radiation, M. Scheller, A. G. Young, J. M. Yarborough, J. V. Moloney, S. W. Koch, C. Y. Drouet d’Aubigny, and C. K. Walker, IEEE Transactions on Terahertz Science and Technology, 2, 271
- (2012) Computation of Optical Forces on Nanoparticles using FDTD Technique”, J. J. Liu, M. Brio and J. V. Moloney, JEMA, 4, 45
- (2009) Curved plasma channel generation using ultraintense Airy beams. Science. American Association for the Advancement of Science. Pavel Polynkin, Miroslav Kolesik, Jerome V Moloney, Georgios A Siviloglou, Demetrios N Christodoulides
- (2008) Optical Forces on a Quantum Dot in Metallic Bowtie Structures. M. Reichelt, C. Dineen, S.W. Koch, J.V. Moloney. In: Photonics Technology Letters, IEEE, 431-43
- (2008) 5-W Yellow Laser by Intracavity Frequency Doubling of High-Power Vertical-External-Cavity Surface-Emitting Laser. M. Fallahi, L. Fan, Y. Kaneda, C. Hessenius, J. Hader, H. Li, J.V. Moloney, B. Kunert, W. Stolz, S.W. Koch and J. Murray IEEE Phot. Tech. Letts, 20, 1700
- (2006) Closed-loop design of a semiconductor laser. J. Hader, J.V. Moloney, M. Fallahi, L. Fan, S.W. Koch, Optics Letters 31, 3300
- (2005) Microscopic Evaluation of Spontaneous Emission- and Auger Processes in Semiconductor Lasers, J. Hader, J.V. Moloney, S.W. Koch IEEE J. Quantum Electron. 41 No. 10
- (2004) Nonlinear optical pulse propagation: From Maxwell's to unidirectional equations, M. Kolesik, J.V. Moloney Phys. Rev E., 70, 036604
- (2002) Unidirectional pulse propagation equation”, M. Kolesik, J.V. Moloney and M. Mlejnek, Phys. Rev. Letts.,89, 2839021
- (1999) Optically turbulent femtosecond light guide in air. M. Mlejnek, M. Kolesik, J. V. Moloney, and E. M. Wright Physical Review Letters, 83 (15), pp. 2938-2941
- (1998) Dynamic spatial replenishment of femtosecond pulses propagating in air. M. Mlejnek, E.M. Wright, and J.V. Moloney. Optics Letters, 23(5), 382384
- (1995) Light-polarization dynamics in surface-emitting semiconductor lasers. M San Miguel, Q Feng, Jerome V Moloney. American Physical Society. Physical Review A Vol. 52, Issue 2, Pg 1728

== Books ==
- Moloney, Jerome V. (1998-08-13). Nonlinear Optical Materials. Springer Science & Business Media. ISBN 978-0-387-98581-7.
- Newell, Alan C.; Moloney, Jerome V. (1992-06-20). Nonlinear Optics. Avalon Publishing. ISBN 978-0-201-51014-0.

== Awards and recognition ==
- 2005 – Alexander von Humboldt Prize in Physics
- 2005 – Fellow of the Optical Society of America
