= Ady Arie =

Israeli engineering professor

- עדי אריה
- Born: 1963 (age 62–63)
- Education: Hebrew University, Tel-Aviv University, Stanford University
- Known for: nonlinear optics, electron optics, light–electron interactions
- Awards: Optica Fellow, Marko and Lucie Chaoul Chair in Nano-Photonics
- Scientific career
- Fields: Electrical engineering
- Workplaces: Tel-Aviv University
- Doctoral advisor: Moshe Tur

Ady Arie (Hebrew: עדי אריה; born: 1963) is an Israeli electrical engineering scientist.

He is a professor in the School of Electrical and Computer Engineering in the Fleischman Faculty of Engineering at Tel-Aviv University (TAU), where he holds the Marko and Lucie Chaoul Chair in Nano-Photonics.

Arie's research focuses on nonlinear optics, electron optics, and light–electron interactions. He is a fellow of Optica.

== Early life and education ==
Ady Arie was born in Israel in 1963. He received his B.Sc. in mathematics and physics from the Hebrew University of Jerusalem in 1983, in the framework of Talpiot project, followed by an M.Sc. in physics (1986) and a Ph.D. in engineering (1992), both from Tel Aviv University. His M.Sc. advisors were Shmuel Goldstein and Moshe Tur, and his PhD advisor was Moshe Tur.

From 1991 to 1993, he held Wolfson and Fulbright postdoctoral fellowships under Prof. Robert L. Byer at Stanford University.

== Academic career ==
Arie joined the Department of Physical Electronics in the School of Electrical and Computer Engineering in the Fleischman Faculty of Engineering at Tel-Aviv University in 1993. He became a full professor in 2006. Arie served as the Vice Dean of Research of the Faculty of Engineering from 2011 to 2013 and as the head of the School of Electrical Engineering 2013 to 2017.

He is also the co-founder and head of the TAU Center for Light Matter Interaction since 2016.

Arie has supervised more than 80 Postdoctoral, Ph.D., and M.Sc. students.

== Professional experience ==
In 2001, Arie was a co-founder and chief technology officer of ZettaLight Inc. He is chair of the national steering committee of the Israeli Planning and Budgeting Committee on Quantum Science and Technology and a member of the national science advisory board of the Israel National Quantum Initiative.

Arie served as a Topical Editor of Optics Letters (2008-2014) and as an Associate Editor of Optica (2018-2024). Since 2025, he has been a Deputy Editor of Optics Express.

== Research ==
Arie's research spans optics, electron microscopy, light–electron interactions, plasmonics and the propagation dynamics of special wavepackets.

His research has included the development of nonlinear optical holography for generating and controlling structured light, including Airy and optical vortex beams. Drawing on an analogy between spin and sum-frequency generation, he proposed and helped demonstrate an all-optical Stern–Gerlach effect, both in space and in time.

He developed quasiperiodic nonlinear photonic crystals for phase matching multiple nonlinear optical processes and to periodically poled ferroelectric crystals for efficient frequency conversion across a broad spectral range.

In electron optics, his team produced the first electron Airy beam and developed masks for shaping electron beams, later applying this to correct spherical aberration and improve resolution in electron microscopy. Using surface gravity water waves as a model system, his group also made the first observation of the Kennard phase of wave packets in a linear potential.

== Honors and awards ==
Arie received several awards, including the Fulbright and the Wolfson Fellowships for postdoctoral scholars and the Alon Fellowship.

In 2010, he was elevated to a fellow of Optica “for significant contributions to the development of periodic and quasi-periodic nonlinear photonic crystals”.

In 2015, he was named to the Marko and Lucie Chaoul Chair in Nano-Photonics at Tel Aviv University.

In 2016 he received the Kadar Foundation Award for excellence in research and in 2025 he received the Lifetime Achievement Award for Excellence in Research, Faculty of Engineering, Tel Aviv University.
