= Bessel beam =

Non-diffractive wave

Evolution of a Bessel beam.

Diagram of axicon and resulting Bessel beam

Cross-section of the Bessel beam and graph of intensity

Bessel beam re-forming central bright area after obstruction

A Bessel beam is a wave whose amplitude is described by a Bessel function of the first kind. Electromagnetic, acoustic, gravitational, and matter waves can all be in the form of Bessel beams. A true Bessel beam is non-diffractive. This means that as it propagates, it does not diffract and spread out; this is in contrast to the usual behavior of light (or sound), which spreads out after being focused down to a small spot. Bessel beams are also self-healing, meaning that the beam can be partially obstructed at one point, but will re-form at a point further down the beam axis.

As with a plane wave, a true Bessel beam cannot be created, as it is unbounded and would require an infinite amount of energy. Reasonably good approximations can be made, however, and these are important in many optical applications because they exhibit little or no diffraction over a limited distance. Approximations to Bessel beams are made in practice either by focusing a Gaussian beam with an axicon lens to generate a Bessel–Gauss beam, by using axisymmetric diffraction gratings, or by placing a narrow annular aperture in the far field. High order Bessel beams can be generated by spiral diffraction gratings.

== Properties ==
The properties of Bessel beams make them extremely useful for optical tweezing, as a narrow Bessel beam will maintain its required property of tight focus over a relatively long section of beam and even when partially occluded by the dielectric particles being tweezed. Similarly, particle manipulation with acoustical tweezers was achieved with a Bessel beam that scatters and produces a radiation force resulting from the exchange of acoustic momentum between the wave-field and a particle placed along its path.

The mathematical function which describes a Bessel beam is a solution of Bessel's differential equation, which itself arises from separable solutions to Laplace's equation and the Helmholtz equation in cylindrical coordinates. The fundamental zero-order Bessel beam has an amplitude maximum at the origin, while a high-order Bessel beam (HOBB) has an axial phase singularity along the beam axis; the amplitude is zero there. HOBBs can be of vortex (helicoidal) or non-vortex types.

X-waves are special superpositions of Bessel beams which travel at constant velocity, and can exceed the speed of light.

Mathieu beams and parabolic (Weber) beams are other types of non-diffractive beams that have the same non-diffractive and self-healing properties of Bessel beams but different transverse structures.

=== Acceleration ===
In 2012 it was theoretically proven and experimentally demonstrated that, with a special manipulation of their initial phase, Bessel beams can be made to accelerate along arbitrary trajectories in free space. These beams can be considered as hybrids that combine the symmetric profile of a standard Bessel beam with the self-acceleration property of the Airy beam and its counterparts. Previous efforts to produce accelerating Bessel beams included beams with helical and sinusoidal trajectories as well as the early effort for beams with piecewise straight trajectories.

=== Attenuation-compensation ===
Beams may encounter losses as they travel through materials which will cause attenuation of the beam intensity. A property common to non-diffracting (or propagation-invariant) beams, such as the Airy beam and Bessel beam, is the ability to control the longitudinal intensity envelope of the beam without significantly altering the other characteristics of the beam. This can be used to create Bessel beams which grow in intensity as they travel and can be used to counteract losses, therefore maintaining a beam of constant intensity as it propagates.

== Applications ==
=== Imaging and microscopy ===
In light-sheet fluorescence microscopy, non-diffracting (or propagation-invariant) beams have been utilised to produce very long and uniform light-sheets which do not change size significantly across their length. The self-healing property of Bessel beams has also shown to give improved image quality at depth as the beam shape is less distorted after travelling through scattering tissue than a Gaussian beam. Bessel beam based light-sheet microscopy was first demonstrated in 2010 but many variations have followed since. In 2018, it was shown that the use of attenuation-compensation could be applied to Bessel beam based light-sheet microscopy and could enable imaging at greater depths within biological specimens.

=== Acoustofluidics ===
Bessel beams are a good candidate for the selectively trapping, because of the concentric circles of pressure maximum and minimum in the transverse planes.
