= Axicon =

Special lens with a conical surface

Diagram of Axicon and resulting Bessel Beam

An axicon is a specialized type of lens that has a conical surface. An axicon transforms a laser beam into a ring shaped distribution. They can be convex or concave and be made of any optical material. The combination with other axicons or lenses allows a wide variety of beam patterns to be generated. It can be used to turn a Gaussian beam into a non-diffractive Bessel-like beam. Axicons were first proposed in 1954 by John McLeod.

Axicons are used in atomic traps and for generating plasma in wakefield accelerators. They are used in eye surgery in cases where a ring-shaped spot is useful.

The Axicon is usually characterized by the ratio of the diameter of the ring to the distance from the lens tip to image plane d/l.

== Special features and Bessel beam shaping ==
Single axicons are usually used to generate an annular light distribution which is laterally constant along the optical axis over a certain range. This special feature results from the generation of (non-diffracting) Bessel-like beams with properties mainly determined by the Axicon angle α.

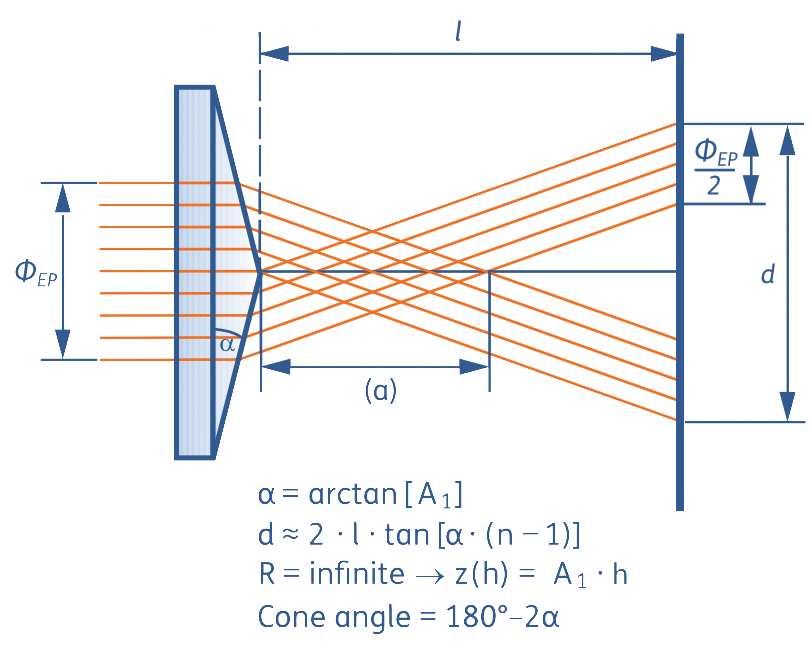
Creation of Bessel beams through an axicon

There are two areas of interest for a variety of applications: a long range with an almost constant intensity distribution (a) and a ring-shaped distant field intensity distribution (b). The distance (a) depends on the angle α of the Axicon and the diameter (ØEP) of the incident beam. The diameter of the annular distant field intensity distribution (b) is proportional to the length l. The width of the ring is about half the diameter of the incident beam.

== Applications ==
One application of axicons is in telescopes, where the usual spherical objective is replaced by an axicon. Such a telescope can be simultaneously in focus for targets at distances from less than a meter to infinity, without making any adjustments. It can be used to simultaneously view two or more small sources placed along the line of sight.

Axicons can be used in laser eye surgery. Their ability to focus a laser beam into a ring is useful in surgery for smoothing and ablating corneal tissue. Using a combination of positive and negative axicons, the diameter of the ring of light can be adjusted to obtain the best performance.

Axicons are also used in optical trapping. The ring of light creates attractive and repulsive forces which can trap and hold microparticles and cells in the center of the ring.

=== Other ===
- Solar concentrators
- Laser resonators
- Breakdown in light filaments
- Gradient index, grating axicons
- Illumination

== Reflaxicons ==
The reflective axicon or "reflaxicon" was described in 1973 by W. R. Edmonds. The reflaxicon uses a pair of coaxial, conical reflecting surfaces to duplicate the functionality of the transmissive axicon. The use of reflection rather than transmission improves the damage threshold, chromatic aberration, and group velocity dispersion compared to conventional axicons.

== Research ==
In research at Physikalisch-Chemisches-Institut, Heidelberg, Germany, axicon lenses have been used in laser diagnostics of mechanical properties of thin films and solids by surface-wave spectroscopy. In these experiments, laser radiation is focused on the surfaces in a concentric ring. The laser pulse generates concentric surface acoustic waves, with amplitude that reaches a maximum in the center of the ring. This approach makes it possible to study mechanical properties of materials under extreme conditions.

Axicons have been used by the research team at Beckman Laser Institute and Medical Clinic to focus a parallel beam into a beam with long focus depth and a highly confined lateral spot, to develop a novel optical coherence tomography (OCT) system.

Inphase Technologies researchers use axicons in holographic data storage. Their goal is to determine the effects of axicons on the Fourier distribution of random binary data spectrum of a spatial light modulator (SLM).

Wendell T. Hill, III's research group at the University of Maryland is focused on creating elements of atom optics, such as beam splitters and beam switches, out of hollow laser beams. These beams, made using axicons, provide an ideal optical trap to channel cold atoms.

An article published by the research team at St. Andrews University in the UK in the Sept. 12 issue of Nature describes axicon use in optical tweezers, which are commonly used for manipulating microscopic particles such as cells and colloids. The tweezers use lasers with a Bessel beam profile produced by illuminating an axicon with a Gaussian beam, which can trap several particles along the beam's axis.
