= Airy beam =

Field of radiation

Evolution of an Airy beam.

An Airy beam is a propagation invariant wave whose main intensity lobe propagates along a curved parabolic trajectory while being resilient to perturbations (self-healing).

== Physical description ==
A cross section of an ideal Airy beam would reveal an area of principal intensity, with a series of adjacent, less luminous areas trailing off to infinity. In reality, the beam is truncated so as to have a finite composition.

As the beam propagates, it does not diffract, i.e., does not spread out. The Airy beam also has the characteristic of freely accelerating. As it propagates, it bends so as to form a parabolic arc.

== History ==
The term "Airy beam" derives from the Airy integral, developed in the 1830s by Sir George Biddell Airy to explain optical caustics such as those appearing in a rainbow.

The Airy waveform was first theorized in 1979 by M. V. Berry and Nándor L. Balázs. They demonstrated a nonspreading Airy wave packet solution to the time--dependent Schrödinger equation for the wavefunction $\psi(x,t)$ of a free particle moving in one spatial dimension, $x$ in time, $t$. The probability density, $|\psi(x,t)|^2$, that is associated with this solution exhibits uniform acceleration in $x$ with time $t$.

In 2007 researchers from the University of Central Florida (United States) were able to create and observe an Airy beam for the first time in both one- and two-dimensional configurations. The members of the team were Georgios Siviloglou, John Broky, Aristide Dogariu, and Demetrios Christodoulides.

In one-dimension, the Airy beam is the only exactly shape-preserving accelerating solution to the free-particle Schrödinger equation (or 2D paraxial wave equation). However, in two dimensions (or 3D paraxial systems), two separable solutions are possible: two-dimensional Airy beams and accelerating parabolic beams. Furthermore, it has been shown that any function on the real line can be mapped to an accelerating beam with a different transverse shape.

In 2009 accelerating "Airy like" beams were observed for the first time in material, notably a system with optical nonlinear behaviour, by a joint team of Pavia University and L'Aquila University (Italy). Subsequently, this kind of beam was investigated in 2011 and 2012 mainly by the teams of University of Central Florida. Since then, Airy beams have been demonstrated for other types of equations such as the Helmholtz equation and Maxwell's equations. Acceleration can also take place along a radial instead of a cartesian coordinate, which is the case of circular-Airy abruptly autofocusing waves and their extension to arbitrary (nonparabolic) caustics. Acceleration is possible even for non-homogeneous periodic systems. With careful engineering of the input waveform, light can be made to accelerate along arbitrary trajectories in media that possess discrete or continuous periodicity.

In 2018, scientists determined the cubic phase of Airy beams in a system analogous to surface gravity water-waves. Using an external hydrodynamic linear potential, they were also able to decelerate the Airy beam analog and halt the self-accelerating front of the Airy beam.

In 2022, a team demonstrated the accelerating nature of Airy beams of terahertz (THz) radiation imaging of objects that were partially obscured by an opaque beam block.

== Mathematical description ==
Using the notation of the original treatment of, we consider solutions $\psi(x,t)$ of the Schrödinger equation for a particle of mass $m$ evolving freely in time, $t$, along a one-dimensional spatial coordinate, $x$:

$i \hbar\frac{\partial \psi(x,t)}{\partial t} = -\frac{\hbar^2}{2m}\frac{\partial^2 \psi(x,t)}{\partial x^2}$,

where $\hbar = h/(2 \pi)$ is the reduced Planck constant and $i$ is the imaginary unit.

As shown in, a solution to that equation is

$\psi(x,t) = \mathrm{Ai} \left[ \frac{B}{\hbar^{2/3}} \left( x - \frac{B^3 t^2}{4 m^2}\right) \right] e^{\left( i \frac{B^3 t}{2 m \hbar} \right) [x - ( \frac{B^3 t^2}{6 m^2} )]}$,

where $\mathrm{Ai}$ is the Airy function and $B$ is chosen so as to fit initial conditions at $t = 0$. It is evident from this expression that the profile $|\psi(x,t)|^2$ undergoes uniform acceleration at a rate of $a = B^3/(2m^2)$.

In actual experimental practice, Airy beams of light, electrons and neutrons have been approximated by programming wavefunctions with spatial light modulation or diffractive elements.

== Experimental observation ==
Georgios Sivilioglou, et al. successfully fabricated an Airy beam in 2007. A beam with a Gaussian distribution was modulated by a spatial light modulator to have an Airy distribution. The result was recorded by a CCD camera.

Airy beams of electrons were demonstrated in 2013 by Voloch-Bloch, et al., using diffraction of electrons by a nanoscale hologram.

In 2024, Airy beams of neutrons with de Broglie wavelength 1.2 nm were demonstrated at the GPSANS small-angle neutron scattering beamline at the High Flux Isotope Reactor of Oak Ridge National Laboratory. The neutron beam was diffracted by an array of 6,250,000 individual 1𝜇m × 1𝜇m phase gratings fabricated on a 0.25 cm^{2} silicon chip; Airy beam profiles were observed after flight paths between 10 and 20 m. In this experiment, Airy diffraction is mediated by the strong interaction between a low-energy neutron and the silicon nuclei, vs. the electromagnetic interaction that governs optical and electron diffraction.

== Modified Airy beams ==
=== Attenuation-compensation ===
Beams may encounter losses as they travel through materials which will cause attenuation of the beam intensity. A property common to non-diffracting (or propagation-invariant) beams, such as the Airy beam and Bessel beam, is the ability to control the longitudinal intensity envelope of the beam without significantly altering the other characteristics of the beam. This can be used to create Airy beams which grow in intensity at they travel and can be used to counteract losses, therefore maintaining a beam of constant intensity as it propagates. In temporal domain, an analogous modified dispersion-free attenuation-compensating Airy-based ("rocket") pulse was previously proposed and demonstrated in, designed to compensate media losses as it propagates through dispersive media.

== Applications ==
=== Optical trapping and manipulation ===
Researchers at the University of St. Andrews have used Airy beams to manipulate small particles, moving them along curves and around corners. This may find use in fields such as microfluidic engineering and cell biology. Significant theoretical works have been also undertaken by F.G. Mitri and his collaborators both in optics and acoustics, and related works can be found in these references: Airy acoustical–sheet spinner tweezers; Acoustics of finite asymmetric exotic beams: Examples of Airy and fractional Bessel beams; Pulling and spinning reversal of a sub-wavelength absorptive sphere in adjustable vector Airy light-sheets; Adjustable vector Airy light-sheet single optical tweezers: negative radiation forces on a subwavelength spheroid and spin torque reversal; Optical radiation force on a dielectric sphere of arbitrary size illuminated by a linearly polarized Airy light-sheet; Optical torque on an absorptive dielectric sphere of arbitrary size illuminated by a linearly-polarized Airy light-sheet; Circularly-polarized Airy light-sheet spinner tweezers and particle transport

(see also: Optical tweezers)

=== Imaging and microscopy ===
Researchers at the University of St. Andrews have further utilised Airy beams to make a large field of view (FOV) while maintaining high axial contrast in a light-sheet microscope. This technique has been adapted to use multi-photon excitation and attenuation-compensated Airy beams to achieve imaging at greater depths within biological specimens.

=== Micro-machining ===
The accelerating and diffraction-free features of the Airy wavepacket have also been utilized by researchers at the University of Crete to produce two-dimensional, circular-Airy waves, termed abruptly-autofocusing beams. These beams tend to focus in an abrupt fashion shortly before a target while maintaining a constant and low intensity profile along the propagated path and can be useful in laser microfabrication or medical laser treatments.

== See also ==
- Bessel beam

== Notes and references ==
- Wave analysis of Airy beams
