= Scorer's function =

Special functions

Graph of $\mathrm{Gi}(x)$ and $\mathrm{Hi}(x)$

In mathematics, the Scorer's functions are special functions studied by Scorer (1950) and denoted Gi(x) and Hi(x).

Hi(x) and -Gi(x) solve the equation

$$y''(x) - x\ y(x) = \frac{1}{\pi}$$

and are given by

$$\mathrm{Gi}(x) = \frac{1}{\pi} \int_0^\infty \sin\left(\frac{t^3}{3} + xt\right)\, dt,$$
$$\mathrm{Hi}(x) = \frac{1}{\pi} \int_0^\infty \exp\left(-\frac{t^3}{3} + xt\right)\, dt.$$

The Scorer's functions can also be defined in terms of Airy functions:

$$\begin{align}
\mathrm{Gi}(x) &{}= \mathrm{Bi}(x) \int_x^\infty \mathrm{Ai}(t) \, dt + \mathrm{Ai}(x) \int_0^x \mathrm{Bi}(t) \, dt, \\
\mathrm{Hi}(x) &{}= \mathrm{Bi}(x) \int_{-\infty}^x \mathrm{Ai}(t) \, dt - \mathrm{Ai}(x) \int_{-\infty}^x \mathrm{Bi}(t) \, dt. \end{align}$$

It can also be seen, just from the integral forms, that the following relationship holds:

$$\mathrm{Gi}(x)+\mathrm{Hi}(x)\equiv \mathrm{Bi}(x)$$

Plot of the Scorer function Gi(z) in the complex plane from -2-2i to 2+2i with colors created with Mathematica 13.1 function ComplexPlot3D

Plot of the derivative of the Scorer function Hi'(z) in the complex plane from -2-2i to 2+2i with colors created with Mathematica 13.1 function ComplexPlot3D

Plot of the derivative of the Scorer function Gi'(z) in the complex plane from -2-2i to 2+2i with colors created with Mathematica 13.1 function ComplexPlot3D

Plot of the Scorer function Hi(z) in the complex plane from -2-2i to 2+2i with colors created with Mathematica 13.1 function ComplexPlot3D
