= George Biddell Airy =

English mathematician and astronomer (1801–1892)

Sir George Biddell Airy KCB FRS
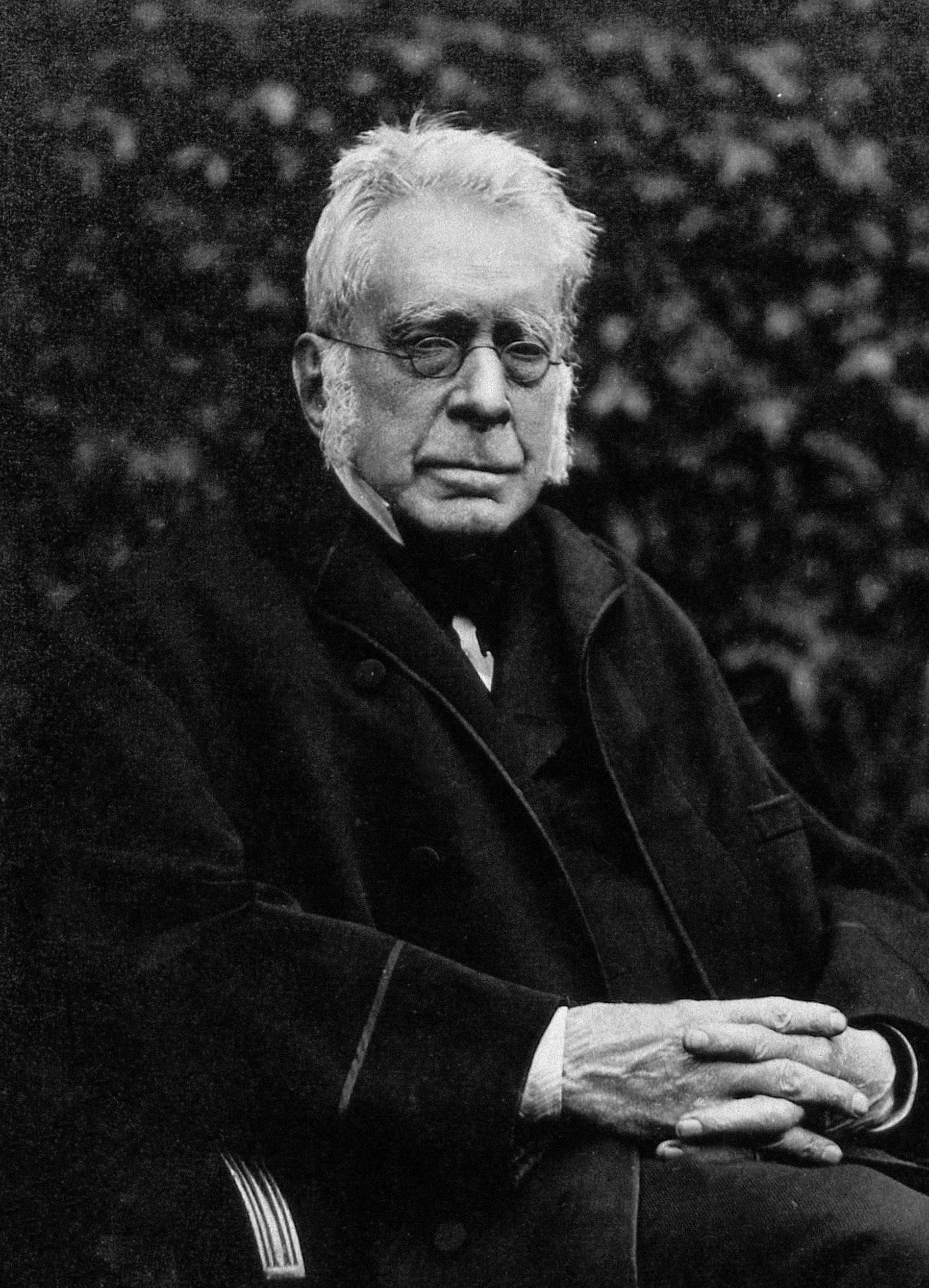
- George Biddell Airy in 1891
- Born: 27 July 1801; Alnwick, Northumberland, England
- Died: 2 January 1892 (aged 90); Greenwich, London, England
- Education: Colchester Royal Grammar School; Trinity College, Cambridge
- Known for: Seventh Astronomer Royal; See full list
- Awards: Smith's Prize (1823); Copley Medal (1831); RAS Gold Medal (1833, 1846); Lalande Prize (1834); Royal Medal (1845); Albert Medal (1876)
- Scientific career
- Fields: Astronomy, mathematics
- Workplaces: Trinity College, Cambridge; Royal Society
- Academic advisors: George Peacock

7th Astronomer Royal
- In office 1835–1881
- Preceded by: John Pond
- Succeeded by: William Christie

Sir George Biddell Airy (/ˈɛəri/; 27 July 1801 – 2 January 1892) was an English mathematician and astronomer, as well as the Lucasian Professor of Mathematics from 1826 to 1828 and the seventh Astronomer Royal from 1835 to 1881. His many achievements include work on planetary orbits, measuring the mean density of the Earth, a method of solution of two-dimensional problems in solid mechanics and, in his role as Astronomer Royal, establishing Greenwich as the location of the prime meridian.

== Biography ==
Airy was born at Alnwick in Northumberland, one of a long line of Airys who traced their descent back to a family of the same name residing at Kentmere, in Westmorland, in the 14th century. The branch to which he belonged, having suffered in the English Civil War, moved to Lincolnshire and became farmers. Airy was educated first at elementary schools in Hereford, and afterwards at Colchester Royal Grammar School. An introverted child, Airy gained popularity with his schoolmates through his great skill in the construction of peashooters.

From the age of 13, Airy stayed frequently with his uncle, Arthur Biddell at Playford, Suffolk. Biddell introduced Airy to his friend Thomas Clarkson, the slave trade abolitionist who lived at Playford Hall. Clarkson had an MA in mathematics from Cambridge, and examined Airy in classics and then subsequently arranged for him to be examined by a Fellow from Trinity College, Cambridge on his knowledge of mathematics. As a result, he entered Trinity in 1819, as a sizar, meaning that he paid a reduced fee but essentially worked as a servant to make good the fee reduction. Here he had a brilliant career, and seems to have been almost immediately recognised as the leading man of his year. In 1822 he was elected scholar of Trinity, and in the following year he graduated as senior wrangler and obtained first Smith's Prize. On 1 October 1824 he was elected fellow of Trinity, and in December 1826 was appointed Lucasian professor of mathematics in succession to Thomas Turton. This chair he held for little more than a year, being elected in February 1828 Plumian professor of astronomy and director of the new Cambridge Observatory. In 1836 he was elected a Fellow of the Royal Society and in 1840, a foreign member of the Royal Swedish Academy of Sciences. In 1859 he became foreign member of the Royal Netherlands Academy of Arts and Sciences.

=== Research ===
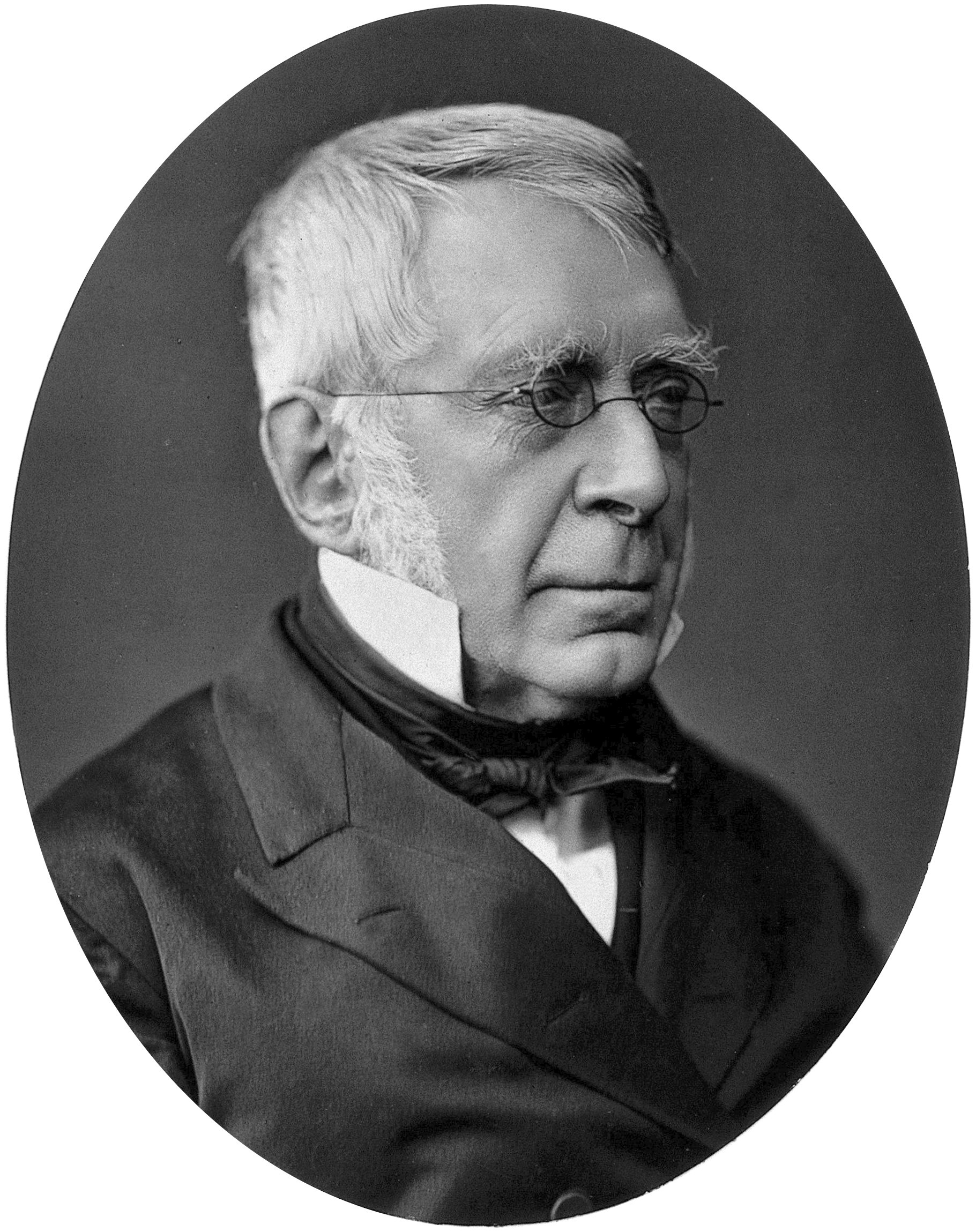
George Biddell Airy

Some idea of his activity as a writer on mathematical and physical subjects during these early years may be gathered from the fact that previous to this appointment he had contributed three important memoirs to the Philosophical Transactions of the Royal Society, and eight to the Cambridge Philosophical Society. At the Cambridge Observatory Airy soon showed his power of organisation. The only telescope in the establishment when he took charge was the transit instrument, and to this he vigorously devoted himself. By the adoption of a regular system of work, and a careful plan of reduction, he was able to keep his observations up to date, and published them annually with a punctuality which astonished his contemporaries. Before long a mural circle was installed, and regular observations were instituted with it in 1833. In the same year the Duke of Northumberland presented the Cambridge observatory with a fine object-glass of 12-inch aperture, which was mounted according to Airy's designs and under his superintendence, although construction was not completed until after he moved to Greenwich in 1835.

Airy's writings during this time are divided between mathematical physics and astronomy. The former are for the most part concerned with questions relating to the theory of light arising out of his professorial lectures, among which may be specially mentioned his paper On the Diffraction of an Object-Glass with Circular Aperture, and his enunciation of the complete theory of the rainbow. In 1831 the Copley Medal of the Royal Society was awarded to him for these researches. Of his astronomical writings during this period the most important are his investigation of the mass of Jupiter, his report to the British Association on the progress of astronomy during the 19th century, and his work On an Inequality of Long Period in the Motions of the Earth and Venus.

One of the sections of his able and instructive report was devoted to "A Comparison of the Progress of Astronomy in England with that in other Countries", very much to the disadvantage of England. This reproach was subsequently to a great extent removed by his own labours.

==== Mean density of the Earth ====
One of the most remarkable of Airy's researches was his determination of the mean density of the Earth. In 1826, the idea occurred to him of attacking this problem by means of pendulum experiments at the top and bottom of a deep mine. His first attempt, made in the same year, at the Dolcoath mine in Cornwall, failed in consequence of an accident to one of the pendulums. A second attempt in 1828 was defeated by a flooding of the mine, and many years elapsed before another opportunity presented itself. The experiments eventually took place at the Harton pit near South Shields in northern England in 1854. Their immediate result was to show that gravity at the bottom of the mine exceeded that at the top by 1/19286 of its amount, the depth being 383 m (1,257 ft). From this he was led to the final value of Earth's specific density of 6.566. This value, although considerably in excess of that previously found by different methods, was held by Airy, from the care and completeness with which the observations were carried out and discussed, to be "entitled to compete with the others on, at least, equal terms." The currently accepted value for Earth's density is 5.5153 g/cm^{3}.

==== Reference geoid ====
In 1830, Airy calculated the lengths of the polar radius and equatorial radius of the earth using measurements taken in the UK. Although his measurements were superseded by more accurate radius figures (such as those used for GRS 80 and WGS84) his Airy geoid (strictly a reference ellipsoid, OSGB36) is still used by Great Britain's Ordnance Survey for mapping of England, Scotland and Wales because it better fits the local sea level (about 80 cm below world average).

==== Planetary inequalities ====
Airy's discovery of a new inequality in the motions of Venus and the Earth is in some respects his most remarkable achievement. In correcting the elements of Delambre's solar tables he had been led to suspect an inequality overlooked by their constructor. The cause of this he did not long seek in vain; thirteen times the mean motion of Venus is so nearly equal to eight times that of Earth that the difference amounts to only a small fraction of Earth's mean motion, and from the fact that the term depending on this difference, although very small in itself, receives in the integration of the differential equations a multiplier of about 2,200,000, Airy was led to infer the existence of a sensible inequality extending over 240 years (Phil. Trans. cxxii. 67). The investigation was probably the most laborious that had been made up to Airy's time in planetary theory, and represented the first specific improvement in the solar tables effected in England since the establishment of the theory of gravity. In recognition of this work the Gold Medal of the Royal Astronomical Society was awarded to him in 1833 (he would win it again in 1846).

==== Airy disk ====
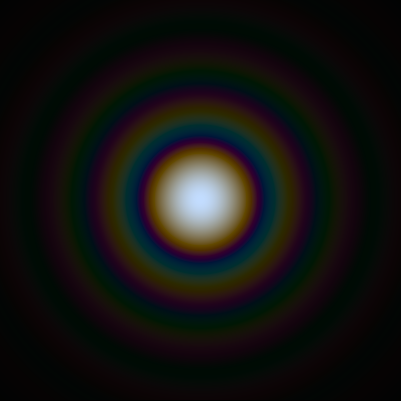
Computer-generated image simulating an Airy Disk

The resolution of optical devices is limited by diffraction. So even the most perfect lens cannot quite generate a point image at its focus, but instead there is a bright central pattern now called the Airy disk, surrounded by concentric rings comprising an Airy pattern. The size of the Airy disk depends on the light wavelength and the size of the aperture. John Herschel had previously described the phenomenon, but Airy was the first to explain it theoretically.

Airy Disk Formation Simulation
| Individual Particles forming pinhole diffraction pattern | Pinhole diffraction probability distribution |

This was a key argument in refuting one of the last remaining arguments for absolute geocentrism: the giant star argument. Tycho Brahe and Giovanni Battista Riccioli pointed out that the lack of stellar parallax detectable at the time entailed that stars were a huge distance away. But the naked eye and the early telescopes with small apertures seemed to show that stars were disks of a certain size. This would imply that the stars were many times larger than the Sun (they were not aware of supergiant or hypergiant stars, but some were calculated to be even larger than the size of the whole universe estimated at the time). However, the disk appearances of the stars were spurious: they were not actually seeing stellar images, but Airy disks. With modern telescopes, even with those having the largest magnification, the images of almost all stars correctly appear as mere points of light.

==== Astronomer Royal ====
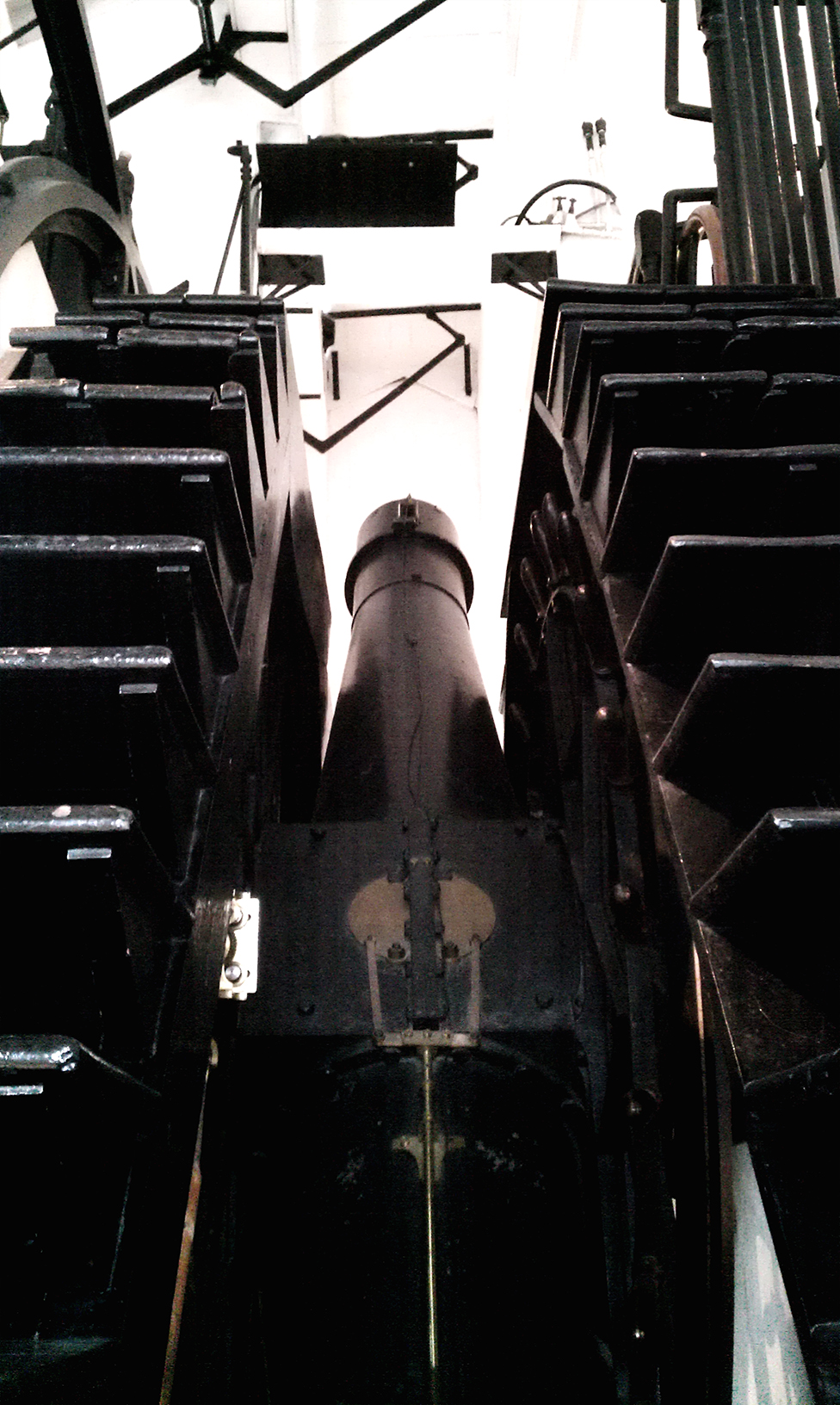
Airy's Transit Circle in the Transit Circle Room of the Royal Greenwich Observatory; for a hundred years from 1884 to 1984, it marked the Prime meridian of the world, or more accurately, the Prime Meridian was marked by or derived from it.

In June 1835 Airy was appointed Astronomer Royal in succession to John Pond, and began his long career at the national observatory which constitutes his chief title to fame. The condition of the observatory at the time of his appointment was such that Lord Auckland, the first Lord of the Admiralty, considered that "it ought to be cleared out," while Airy admitted that "it was in a queer state." With his usual energy he set to work at once to reorganise the whole management. He remodelled the volumes of observations, put the library on a proper footing, mounted the new (Sheepshanks) equatorial and organised a new magnetic observatory. In 1847 an altazimuth was erected, designed by Airy to enable observations of the moon to be made not only on the meridian, but whenever it might be visible. In 1848 Airy invented the reflex zenith tube to replace the zenith sector previously employed. At the end of 1850 the great transit circle of 203 mm (8.0 in) aperture and 3.5 metres (11 feet 6 inches) focal length was erected, and is still the principal instrument of its class at the observatory. The mounting in 1859 of an equatorial of 330 mm (13 in) aperture evoked the comment in his journal for that year, "There is not now a single person employed or instrument used in the observatory which was there in Mr Pond's time"; and the transformation was completed by the inauguration of spectroscopic work in 1868 and of the photographic registration of sunspots in 1873.

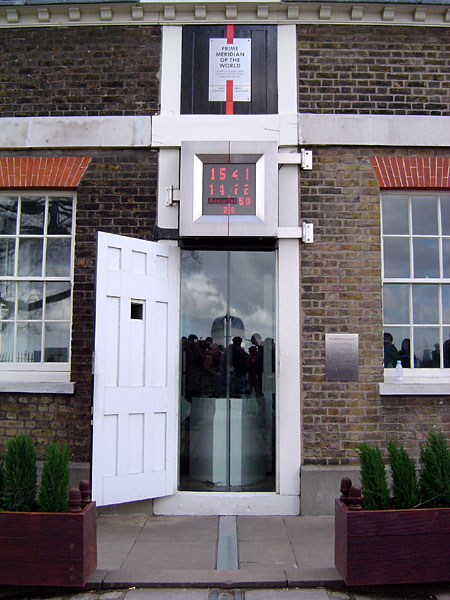
The Prime Meridian in Greenwich (1884–1984); the telescope shown above left is behind the glass

The formidable undertaking of reducing the accumulated planetary observations made at Greenwich from 1750 to 1830 was already in progress under Airy's supervision when he became Astronomer Royal. Shortly afterwards he undertook the further laborious task of reducing the enormous mass of observations of the moon made at Greenwich during the same period under the direction, successively, of James Bradley, Nathaniel Bliss, Nevil Maskelyne and John Pond, to defray the expense of which a large sum of money was allotted by the Treasury. As a result, no fewer than 8,000 lunar observations were rescued from oblivion, and were, in 1846, placed at the disposal of astronomers in such a form that they could be used directly for comparison with the theory and for the improvement of the tables of the moon's motion.

For this work Airy received in 1848 a testimonial from the Royal Astronomical Society, and it at once led to the discovery by Peter Andreas Hansen of two new inequalities in the moon's motion. After completing these reductions, Airy made inquiries, before engaging in any theoretical investigation in connection with them, whether any other mathematician was pursuing the subject, and learning that Hansen had taken it in hand under the patronage of the king of Denmark, but that, owing to the death of the king and the consequent lack of funds, there was danger of his being compelled to abandon it, he applied to the admiralty on Hansen's behalf for the necessary sum. His request was immediately granted, and thus it came about that Hansen's famous Tables de la Lune were dedicated to La Haute Amirauté de sa Majesté la Reine de la Grande Bretagne et d'Irlande.

In 1851 Airy established a new Prime Meridian at Greenwich. This line, the fourth "Greenwich Meridian", became the definitive internationally recognised line in 1884. It was superseded by the IERS Reference Meridian in 1984, which runs approximately 102 metres to the east.

==== Search for Neptune ====
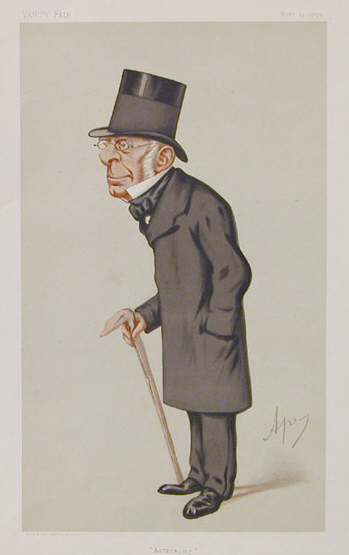
George Biddell Airy caricatured by Ape in Vanity Fair Nov 1875

In June 1846, Airy started corresponding with French astronomer Urbain Le Verrier over the latter's prediction that irregularities in the motion of Uranus were due to a so-far unobserved body. Aware that Cambridge Astronomer John Couch Adams had suggested that he had made similar predictions, on 9 July Airy urged James Challis to undertake a systematic search in the hope of securing the triumph of discovery for Britain. Ultimately, a rival search in Berlin by Johann Gottfried Galle, instigated by Le Verrier, won the race for priority. Though Airy was "abused most savagely both by English and French" for his failure to act on Adams's suggestions more promptly, there have also been claims that Adams's communications had been vague and dilatory and further that the search for a new planet was not the responsibility of the Astronomer Royal.

==== Ether drag test ====
Using a water-filled telescope, in 1871 Airy looked for a change in stellar aberration through the refracting water due to the aether drag hypothesis. Like all other attempts to detect aether drift or drag, Airy obtained a negative result.

==== Lunar theory ====
In 1872 Airy conceived the idea of treating the lunar theory in a new way, and at the age of seventy-one he embarked on the prodigious toil which this scheme entailed. A general description of his method will be found in the Monthly Notices of the Royal Astronomical Society, vol. xxxiv, No. 3. It consisted essentially in the adoption of Charles-Eugène Delaunay's final numerical expressions for longitude, latitude, and parallax, with a symbolic term attached to each number, the value of which was to be determined by substitution in the equations of motion.

In this mode of treating the question the order of the terms is numerical, and though the amount of labour is such as might well have deterred a younger man, yet the details were easy, and a great part of it might be entrusted to "a mere computer". (Note: At the time that this was written, the term "computer" referred to a human being who performed calculating work, either manually or with mechanical aids.)

The work was published in 1886, when its author was eighty-five years of age. For some little time previously he had been harassed by a suspicion that certain errors had crept into the computations, and accordingly he addressed himself to the task of revision. But his powers were no longer what they had been, and he was never able to examine sufficiently into the matter. In 1890 he tells us how a grievous error had been committed in one of the first steps, and pathetically adds, "My spirit in the work was broken, and I have never heartily proceeded with it since."

==== Engineering mechanics ====
===== Stress function method =====
In 1862, Airy presented a new technique to determine the strain and stress field within a beam. This technique, sometimes called the Airy stress function method, can be used to find solutions to many two-dimensional problems in solid mechanics. For example, it was used by H. M. Westergaard to determine the stress and strain field around a crack tip and thereby this method contributed to the development of fracture mechanics.

===== Tay Bridge disaster =====
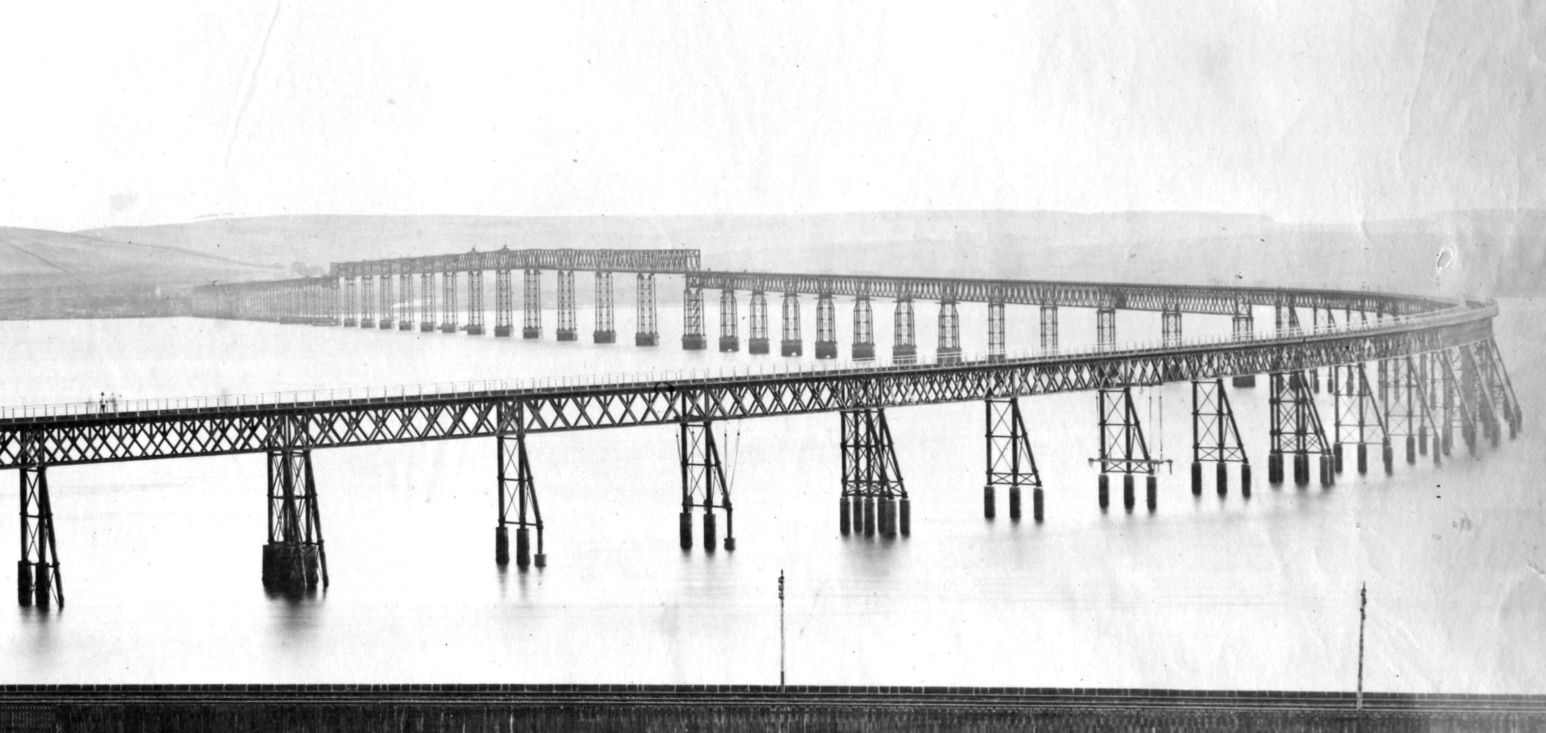
Original Tay Bridge from the north

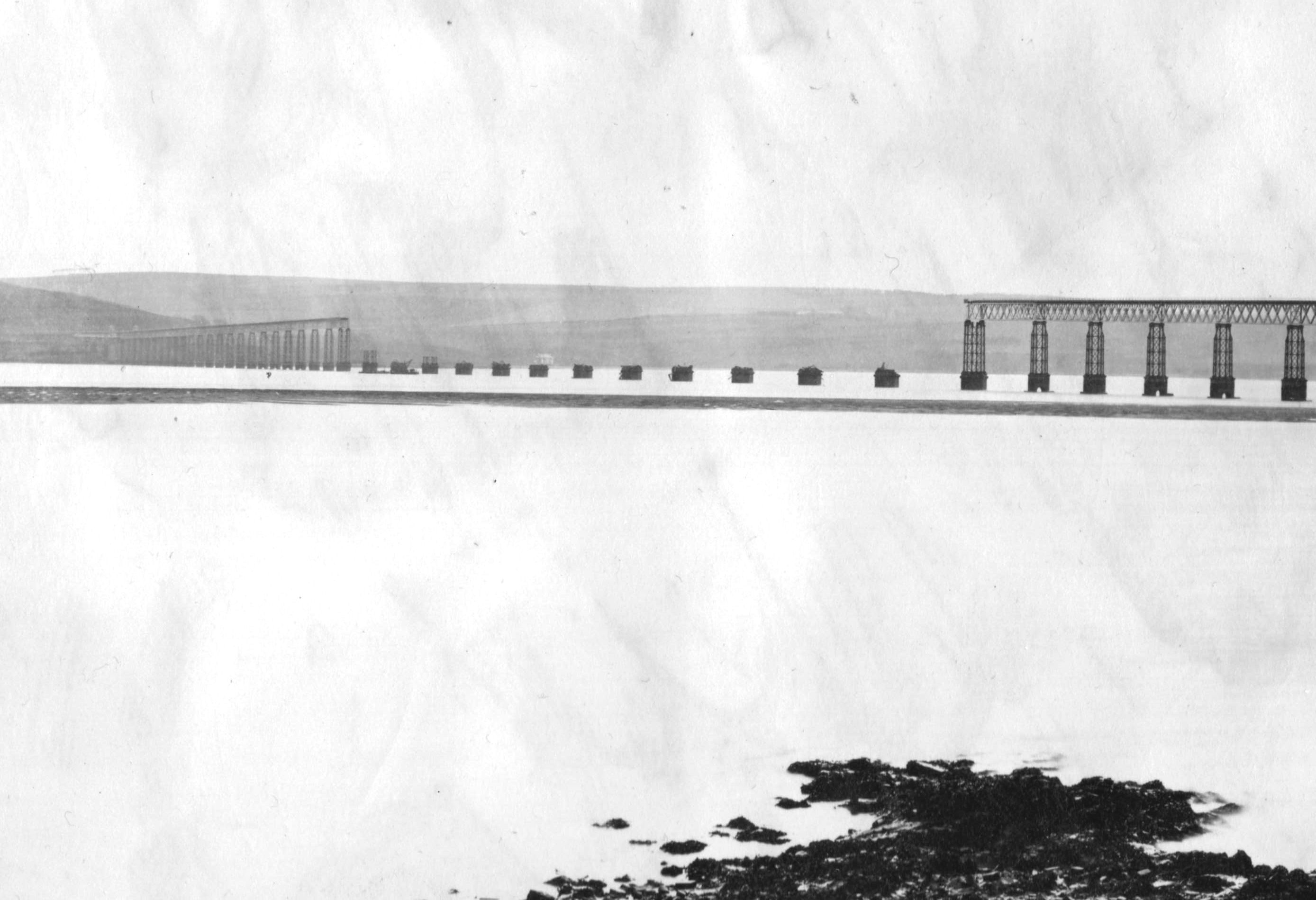
The original Tay Bridge after collapsing

Airy was consulted about wind speeds and pressures likely to be encountered on the proposed Forth suspension bridge being designed by Thomas Bouch for the North British Railway in the late 1870s. He thought that pressures no greater than about 10 pounds per square foot (500 pascals) could be expected, a comment Bouch took to mean also applied to the first Tay Railway Bridge then being built. Much greater pressures, however, can be expected in severe storms. Airy was called to give evidence before the official inquiry into the Tay Bridge disaster, and was criticised for his advice. However, little was known about the problems of wind resistance of large structures, and a Royal Commission on Wind Pressure was asked to conduct research into the problem.

==== Controversy ====
Airy was described in his obituary published by the Royal Society as being "a tough adversary" and stories of various disagreements and conflicts with other scientists survive. Francis Ronalds discovered Airy to be his foe while he was inaugural Honorary Director of the Kew Observatory, which Airy considered to be a competitor to Greenwich. Other well documented conflicts were with Charles Babbage and Sir James South.

=== Private life ===
In July 1824, Airy met Richarda Smith (1804–1875), "a great beauty", on a walking tour of Derbyshire. He later wrote, "Our eyes met ... and my fate was sealed ... I felt irresistibly that we must be united," and Airy proposed two days later. Richarda's father, the Revd Richard Smith, felt that Airy lacked the financial resources to marry his daughter. Only in 1830, with Airy established in his Cambridge position, was permission for the marriage granted.

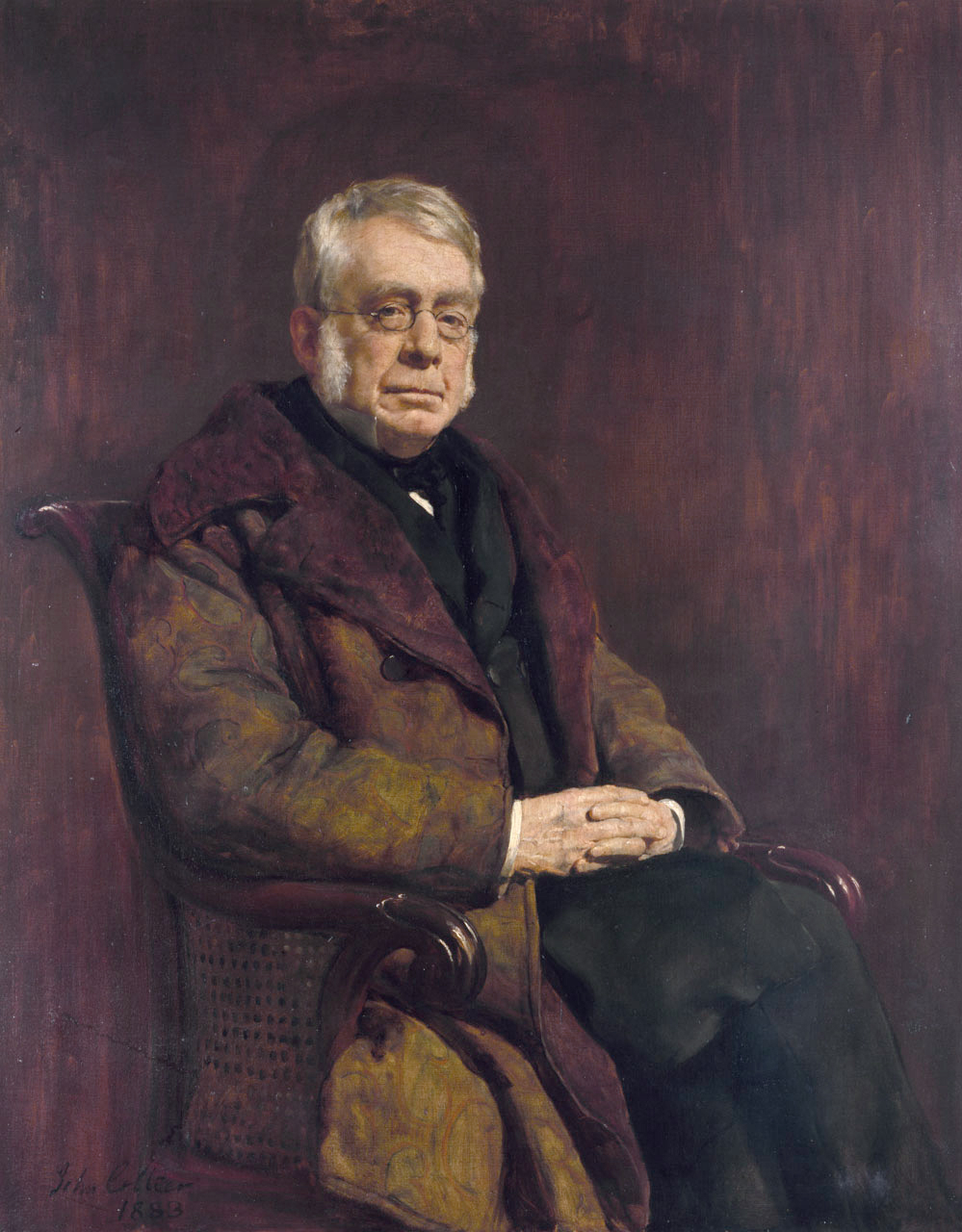
George Biddell Airy (by John Collier, 1883)

The Airys had nine children, the first three of whom died young.

- Elizabeth Airy (born 1833) died of consumption (tuberculosis) in 1852.
- The eldest child to survive to adulthood was Wilfrid (1836–1925), who designed and engineered "Colonel" George Tomline's Orwell Park Observatory. Wilfrid's daughter was the artist Anna Airy. Anna's mother died shortly after she was born, and she was raised by her maiden aunts Christabel and Annot (see below).
- George Airy's son Hubert Airy (1838–1903) was a doctor, and a pioneer in the study of migraine. Airy himself suffered from this condition.
- The Airys' eldest daughter, Hilda (1840–1916), married the mathematician Edward Routh in 1864.
- Christabel (1842–1917) died unmarried, as did the next sister Annot (1843–1924).
- The Airys' youngest child was Osmund (1845–1929).

Airy was knighted on 17 June 1872.

Airy retired in 1881, living with his two unmarried daughters at Croom's Hill near Greenwich. In 1891, he suffered a fall and an internal injury. He survived the consequential surgery only a few days. His wealth at death was £27,713, equivalent to £3,746,548.49 in 2021. Airy and his wife and three pre-deceased children are buried at St. Mary's Church in Playford, Suffolk. A cottage owned by Airy still stands, adjacent to the church and now in private hands.

Sir Patrick Moore claimed in his autobiography that the ghost of Airy has been seen haunting the Royal Greenwich Observatory after nightfall.

== Legacy and honours ==
- Elected president of the Royal Astronomical Society four times, for a total of seven years (1835–37, 1849–51, 1853–55, 1863–64). No other person has been president more than four times (a record he shares with Francis Baily).
- Foreign Honorary Member of the American Academy of Arts and Sciences (1832)
- Elected to Honorary membership of the Manchester Literary and Philosophical Society 1843.
- The Martian crater Airy is named for him. Within that crater lies another smaller crater called Airy-0 whose location defines the prime meridian of that planet, as does the location of Airy's 1850 telescope for Earth.
- winner of the Lalande Prize for astronomy from the French Academy of Sciences, 1834
- Elected as a member of the American Philosophical Society in 1879.
- There is also a lunar crater Airy named in his honour.
- Airy wave theory is the linear theory for the propagation of gravity waves on the surface of a fluid.
- The Airy functions Ai(x) and Bi(x) and the differential equation they arise from are named in his honour, as well as the Airy disc and Airy points.
- Honorary Fellow of the Institution of Engineering and Technology.

== Bibliography ==
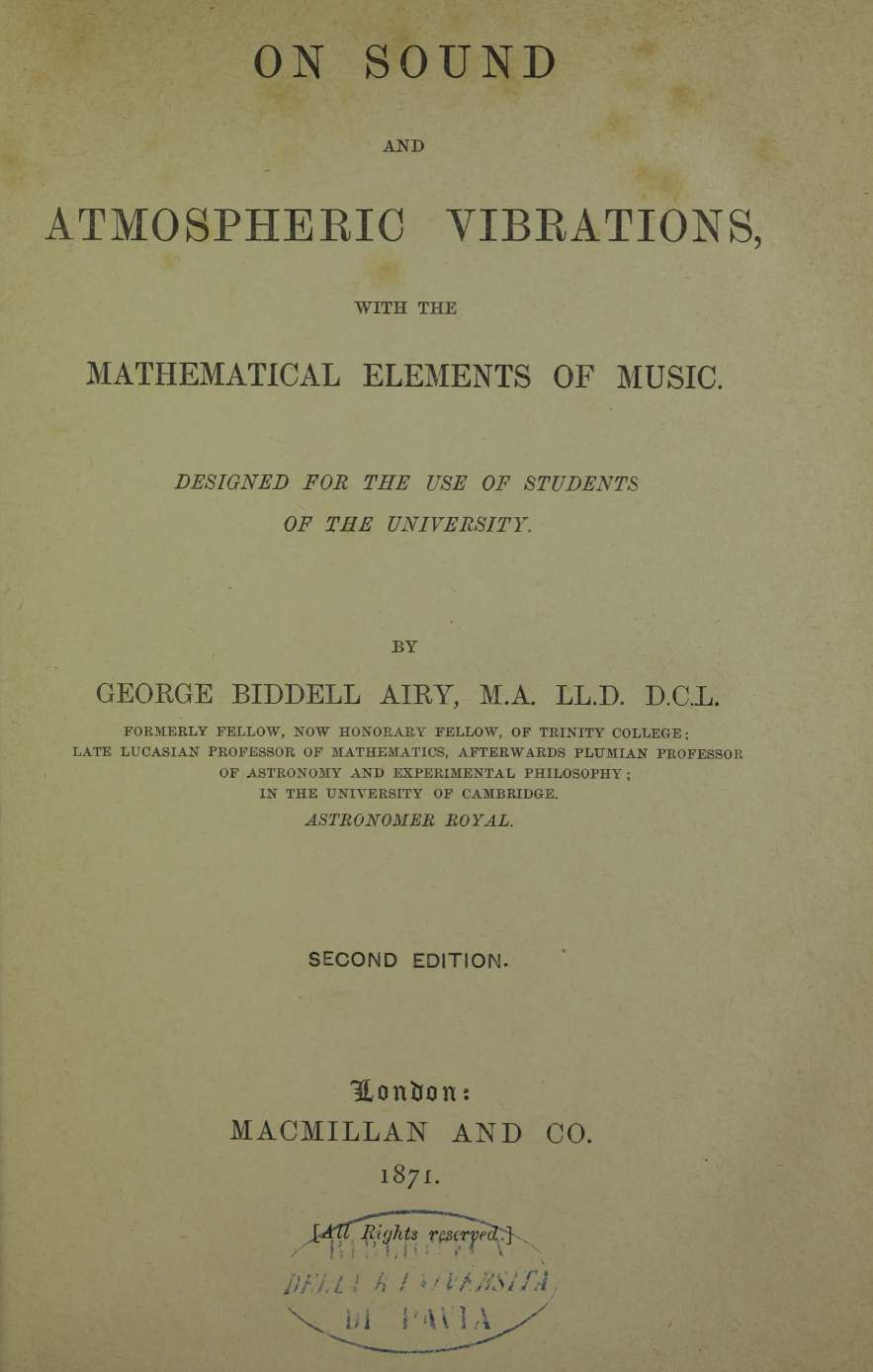
On sound and atmospheric vibrations with the mathematical elements of music, 1871

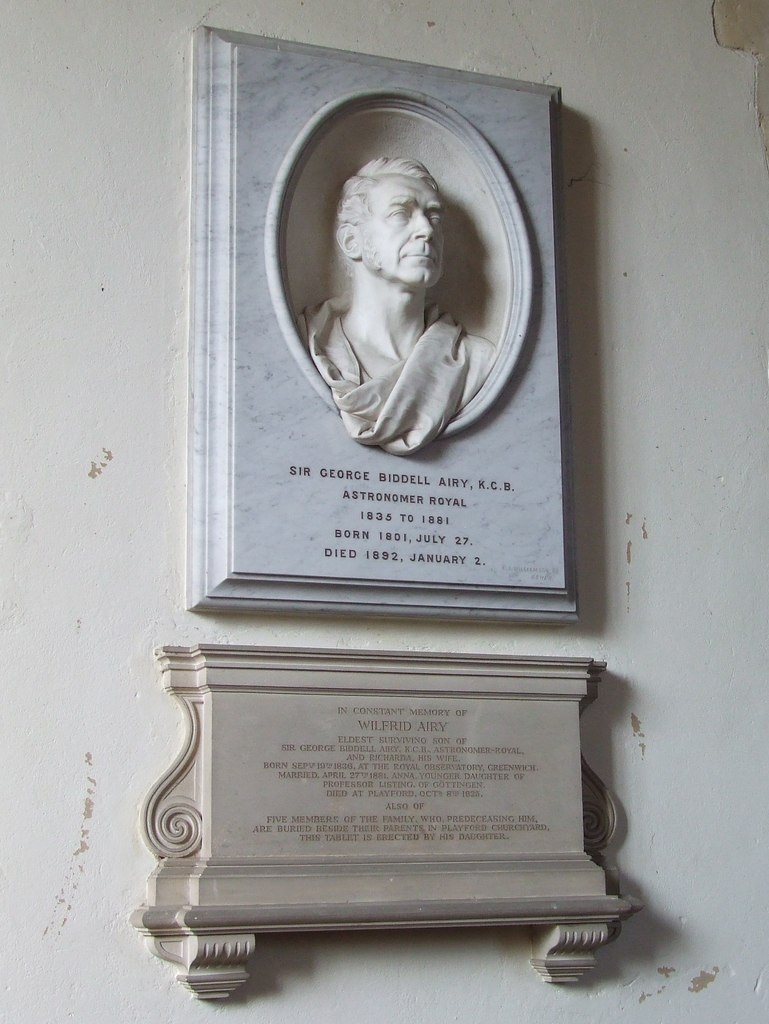
Memorial in St Mary's Playford

=== By Airy ===
For a list of works by George Biddell Airy (with digital copies) see Wikisource.

A complete list of Airy's 518 printed papers is in Airy (1896). Among the most important are:

- (1826) Mathematical Tracts on Physical Astronomy
- (1828) On the Lunar Theory, The Figure of the Earth, Precession and Nutation, and Calculus of Variations, to which, in the second edition of 1828, were added tracts on the Planetary Theory and the Undulatory Theory of Light
- (1834) Gravitation: an Elementary Explanation of the Principal Perturbations in the Solar System (Full text at Internet Archive)
- (1839) Experiments on Iron-built Ships, instituted for the purpose of discovering a correction for the deviation of the Compass produced-by the Iron of the Ships
- (1848 [1881, 10th edition]) Popular Astronomy: A Series of Lectures Delivered at Ipswich (Full text at Wikisource)
- (1855) A Treatise on Trigonometry (Full text at Google Books)
- (1861) On the Algebraic and Numerical Theory of Errors of Observations and the Combination of Observations.
- (1866) An Elementary Treatise on Partial Differential Equations (Full text at Internet Archive)
- (1868) On Sound and Atmospheric Vibrations with the Mathematical Elements of Music (Full text at MPIWG)
- (1870) A Treatise on Magnetism (Full text at Google Books)

=== About Airy ===
- Airy, George Biddell; Wilfrid, Airy (1896). The Autobiography of Sir George Biddell Airy. Cambridge University Press. p. 342. OCLC 13130558. "edward maunder astronomer."
- Cannon, W.F. (November 1964). "Scientists and broad churchmen: an early Victorian intellectual network". The Journal of British Studies. 4 (1): 65–88. doi:10.1086/385492. JSTOR 175122. PMID 19588590. S2CID 42948903.
- Satterthwaite, G. E. (2003). "Airy's zenith telescopes and "the Birth-Star of Modern Astronomy"". Journal of Astronomical History and Heritage. 6 (1). James Cook University: 13. Bibcode:2003JAHH....6...13S. doi:10.3724/SP.J.1440-2807.2003.01.02. S2CID 117043816.
- Winterburn, E. (2002). "The Airy Transit Circle". British History – Victorians. BBC.

== See also ==
- List of presidents of the Royal Society

Professional and academic associations
| Preceded by Edward Sabine | 31st President of the Royal Society; 1871–1878 | Succeeded by Joseph Dalton Hooker |
