= Airy-0 =

Crater on Mars whose location defines the position of the prime meridian

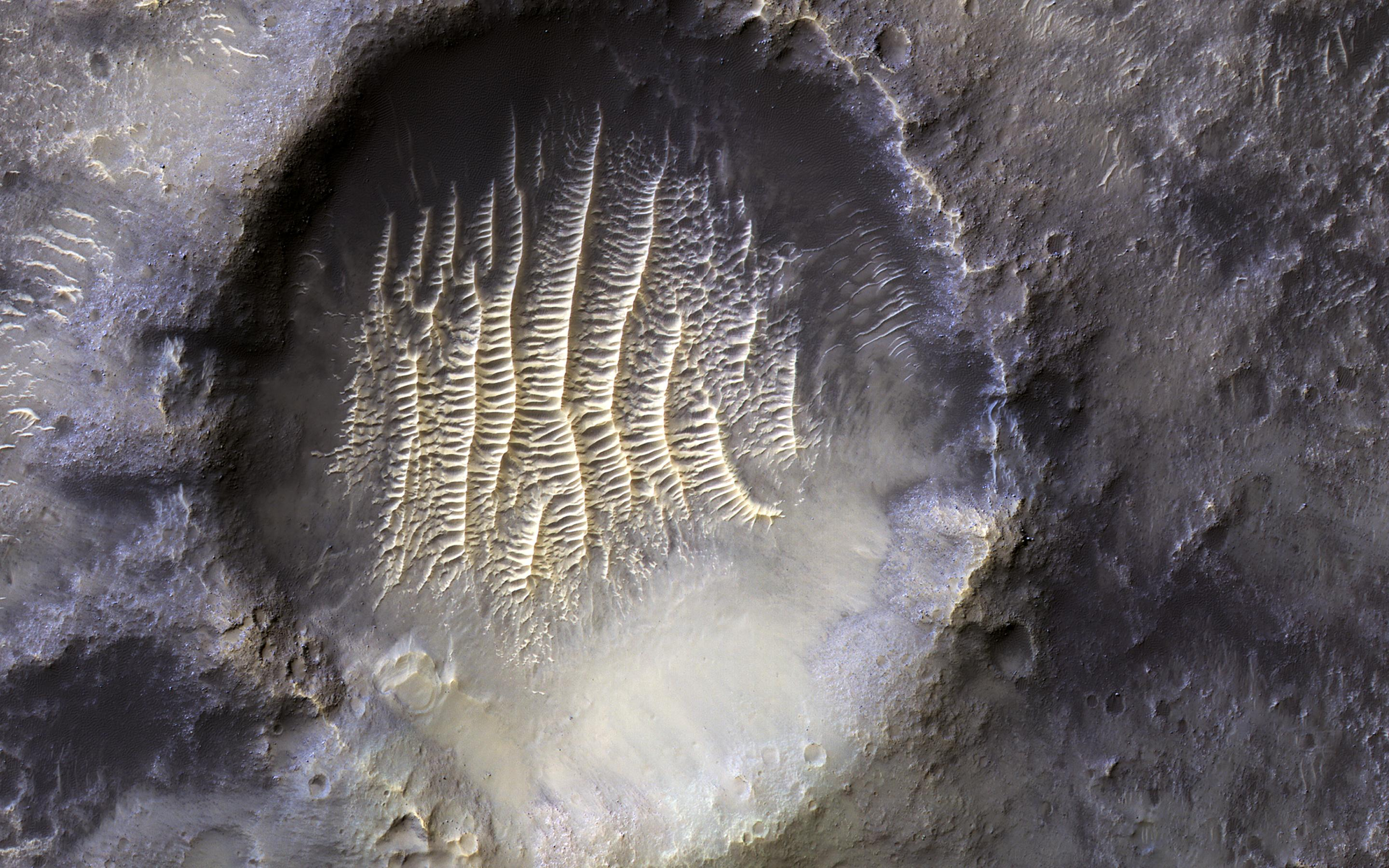
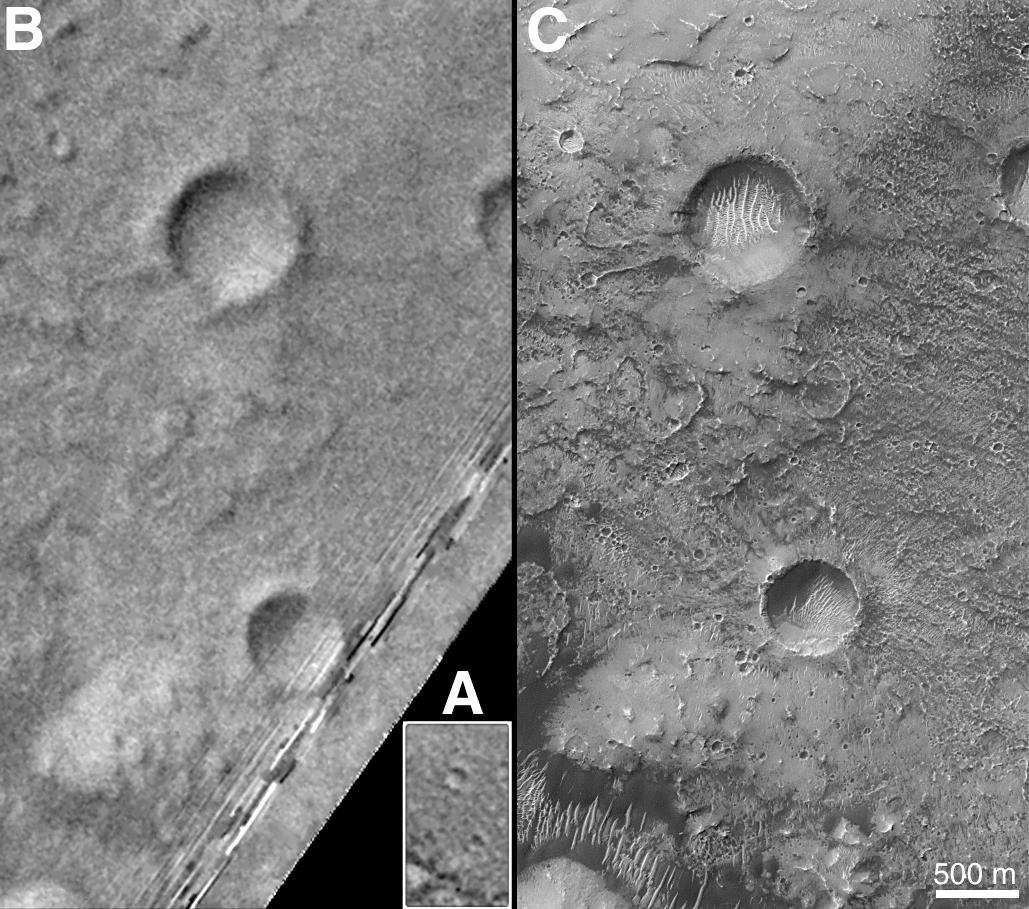
- Airy-0 Crater from MRO; also, from A to C, Mariner 9, Viking 1 and Mars Global Surveyor (Airy-0 is the larger crater in top center of each frame).
- Planet: Mars
- Region: Inside Airy Crater
- Coordinates: 5.1°S 0°E
- Quadrangle: Sinus Sabaeus
- Diameter: 0.5 kilometres (0.31 mi)
- Eponym: Sir George Biddell Airy

Airy-0 is a crater inside the larger Airy Crater on Mars, whose location historically defined the Martian prime meridian. It is about 0.5 km (0.3 mile) across and lies within the dark region Sinus Meridiani, one of the early albedo features to be identified on Mars. In 2018, the IAU Working Group on Cartographic Coordinates and Rotational Elements recommended setting the longitude of the Viking 1 lander (47.95137° west) as the reference line. (Note: In other words, the Martian Prime Meridian (0° longitude) is defined to be 47.95137° east of the Viking 1 lander site's meridian. The effect of the decision was to make more precise the location of the prime meridian within the 500 meter span of Airy-0.) This definition maintains the position of the center of Airy-0 at 0° longitude, within the tolerance of current cartographic uncertainties.

Merton Davies tied this crater into an extensive geodetic control network of the planet Mars based on Mariner 9 and earlier photographs. The Mariner 9 Geodesy/Cartography Group proposed that the prime meridian of Mars be defined by the center of Airy-0, which was selected by Harold Masursky, Gerard de Vaucouleurs, and Merton Davies at a Group meeting on 14 August 1972.

It was named in honor of the British Astronomer Royal Sir George Biddell Airy (1801–1892), who in 1850 built the transit circle telescope at Greenwich. The location of that telescope was subsequently chosen to define the location of Earth's prime meridian.

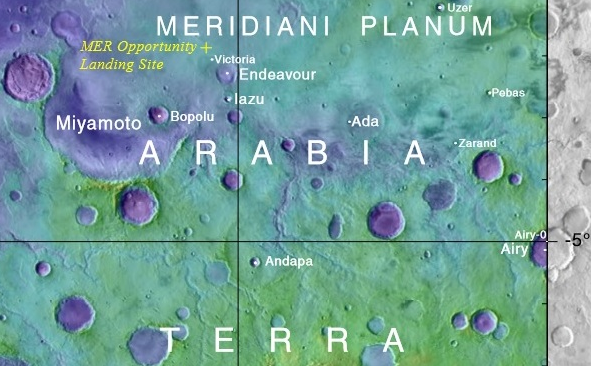
Annotated elevation map of Opportunity landing site and some surrounding craters including Endeavour and Airy. The prime meridian is the right-hand edge of the coloured part of this image, Airy-0 is just below 5°S.
