= Airy zeta function =

In mathematics, the Airy zeta function, studied by Crandall (1996), is a function analogous to the Riemann zeta function and related to the zeros of the Airy function.

== Definition ==
The Airy functions Ai and Bi

The Airy function

$$\mathrm{Ai}(x) = \frac{1}{\pi} \int_0^\infty \cos\left(\tfrac13t^3 + xt\right)\, dt,$$

is positive for positive x, but oscillates for negative values of x. The Airy zeros are the values $\{a_i\}_{i=1}^\infty$ at which $\text{Ai}(a_i) = 0$, ordered by increasing magnitude: $|a_1|<|a_2|<\cdots$ .

The Airy zeta function is the function defined from this sequence of zeros by the series

$$\zeta_{\mathrm{Ai}}(s)=\sum_{i=1}^{\infty} \frac{1}{|a_i|^s}.$$

This series converges when the real part of s is greater than 3/2, and may be extended by analytic continuation to other values of s.

== Evaluation at integers ==
Like the Riemann zeta function, whose value $\zeta(2)=\pi^2/6$ is the solution to the Basel problem, the Airy zeta function may be exactly evaluated at s = 2:

$$\zeta_{\mathrm{Ai}}(2)=\sum_{i=1}^{\infty} \frac{1}{a_i^2}=\frac{3^{5/3}\Gamma^4(\frac23)}{4\pi^2},$$

where $\Gamma$ is the gamma function, a continuous variant of the factorial. Similar evaluations are also possible for larger integer values of s.

It is conjectured that the analytic continuation of the Airy zeta function evaluates at 1 to

$$\zeta_{\mathrm{Ai}}(1)=-\frac{\Gamma(\frac23)}{\Gamma(\frac43)\sqrt[3]{9}}.$$
