= Gevrey =

Gevrey may refer to:

- Gevrey-Chambertin
- Maurice Gevrey, mathematician
  - Gevrey class in mathematics
