= Asymptotic expansion =

Series of functions in mathematics

In mathematics, an asymptotic expansion, asymptotic series, or Poincaré expansion is a formal series used to approximate a given function near a specific point or at infinity. The term asymptotic series is commonly reserved for a divergent series whose terms initially decrease to a minimum magnitude and then increase without bound. Although divergent, the truncated series provides an approximation with increasing accuracy as the function's argument approaches the asymptotic limit. These expansions are useful when a standard Taylor series converges too slowly, as an asymptotic series can often give high accuracy with only a few terms. An asymptotic expansion depends on the domain and limit point. A function of a real variable may require distinct series near the origin versus at infinity. An entire function of a complex variable may require distinct asymptotic series for different sectors of the complex plane, a behavior called the Stokes phenomenon.

The most common type of asymptotic expansion is a power series in either positive or negative powers. Asymptotic series commonly occur when using the Euler–Maclaurin summation formula and integral transforms such as the Laplace and Mellin transforms. Repeated integration by parts will often generate an asymptotic expansion.

Asymptotic analysis plays an important role in singular perturbation theory and for solving nonlinear equations in fluid mechanics. Today, asymptotic series are used in the analysis of algorithms in computer science, the evaluation of complex integrals and partial sums, and the study of differential equations and difference equations.

== History ==
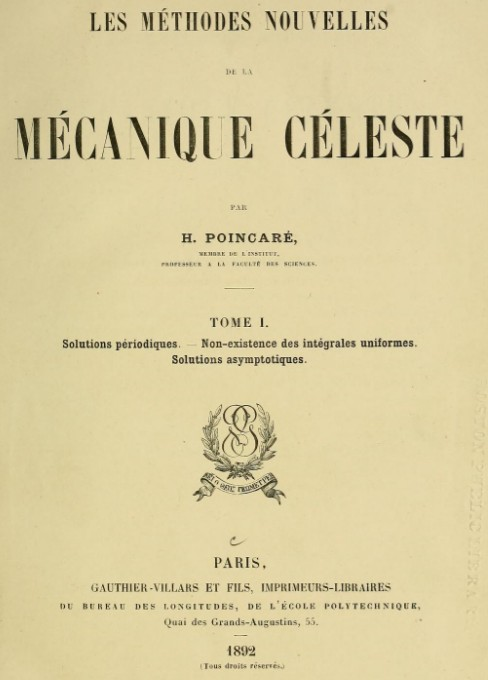
Tome 1 of Henri Poincaré's three-volume work, Les Méthodes Nouvelles de la Mécanique Céleste (1892). Poincaré pioneered the use of asymptotic expansions in celestial mechanics.

Early mathematicians considered asymptotic series unreliable due to their divergence. In a 1747 letter to John Canton, the Reverend Thomas Bayes observed that the Stirling series for the logarithm of the factorial function eventually diverges. Bayes maintained that asymptotic series were “not to be depended upon," arguing that any method generating an inexact result is flawed. Leonhard Euler held a more insightful view, stating that "the sum of any infinite series is the finite expression, by the expansion of which the series is generated." This view anticipated the mathematical concept of regularization, which assigns a definite value to a divergent asymptotic series.

A major breakthrough occurred when George Stokes studied the Airy function. He discovered that although the Airy function is an entire function, it requires different asymptotic series in distinct sectors of the complex plane, an effect called the Stokes phenomenon. He observed that truncating a divergent series at its minimum term led to accurate approximation, a method that would later lead to superasymptotic expansions.

In 1886, Henri Poincaré and Thomas Joannes Stieltjes independently established the mathematical foundations for asymptotic expansions. While Poincaré focused on their formal analytical properties for use in celestial mechanics, Stieltjes sought practical numerical approximations for specific functions and integrals. Stieltjes proved that the truncation error is bounded by the magnitude of the first omitted term. He introduced the half the least term rule, showing that adding half the least term to the sum of all preceding terms often gives an accurate approximation for alternating series. Stieltjes was able to estimate the remainder terms for several integral-defined functions.

Modern efforts focus on how to further improve the accuracy of asymptotic approximations. Robert Balson Dingle introduced terminants, integrals used to assign a value to the series divergent tail. Building on this foundation, Michael Berry and Christopher Howls developed hyperasymptotic expansions which give high accuracy approximations.

== Definitions ==
If $\varphi_n$ is a sequence of functions of asymptotic variable $x$ on some domain, and if $L$ is a limit point of the domain, then the sequence is an asymptotic scale if for every $n$

$$\varphi_{n+1}(x) = o(\varphi_n(x)) \quad (x \to L)$$.

Here, $o$ is the little-o notation. Each function within the scale is called a gauge function. Equivalently, each successive gauge function in the scale vanishes or grows strictly slower than its predecessor as $x \to L$. Commonly, $L$ is taken to be zero or infinity. If $L$ is a finite number, it is called a distinguished point of the scale.

If $f$ is a function on the domain of the asymptotic scale, then $f$ has a standard asymptotic expansion with respect to the scale as a formal series:

$$\sum_{m=0}^n a_m \varphi_{m}(x)$$

if

$$f(x) - \sum_{m=0}^{n-1} a_m \varphi_{m}(x) = O(\varphi_{n}(x)) \quad (x \to L)$$

or the weaker condition

$$f(x) - \sum_{m=0}^{n-1} a_m \varphi_{m}(x) = o(\varphi_{n-1}(x)) \quad (x \to L)\$$

is satisfied. Here, $O$ is the Big-O notation. If one or the other holds for all $n$, this is indicated as:

$$f(x) \sim \sum_{m=0}^\infty a_m \varphi_m(x) \quad (x \to L)\ .$$

A convergent series for any fixed $x$ approximates the function as the number of terms approaches infinity. In contrast, the asymptotic series for a fixed number of terms approximates the function as $x$ approaches the limit $L$.

The function $f$ is a sum of its truncated asymptotic series, identified by its truncation index $n$, and a remainder, $r_{n}(x)$:

$$f(x) = \sum^{n-1}_{m=0} a_{m} \varphi_{m}(x) + r_{n}(x).$$

This finite series approximates the function with a truncation error equal to the remainder. The series tail, $t_{n}(x)$, is the remaining part of the series:

$$t_{n}(x) = \sum^{\infty}_{m=n} a_{m} \varphi_{m}(x).$$

Regularization of an asymptotic series identifies the underlying function, $f(x)$, that generates the asymptotic series expansion, assigning the series a unique value for each point in its domain.

== Properties ==
=== Unique expansion ===
The asymptotic expansion of a function $f(x)$ is unique for a specific region, scale and limit. The function has uniquely determined coefficients $\{a_n\}$ in the following way:
$$\begin{align}
a_{0} &= \lim_{x \to L} \frac{f(x)}{\varphi_{0}(x)} \\
a_{1} &= \lim_{x \to L} \frac{f(x) - a_{0} \varphi_{0}(x)} {\varphi_{1}(x)} \\
& \;\;\vdots \\
a_{n} &= \lim_{x \to L} \frac {f(x) - \sum_{m=0}^{n-1} a_{m} \varphi_{m}(x)} {\varphi_{n}(x)}
\end{align}$$
where $L$ is the limit point of this asymptotic expansion (may be $\pm \infty$).

However, a function may have distinct expansions using distinct asymptotic scales. An example is:
$$\begin{aligned}
\dfrac{1}{(1+x)}&\sim \sum^{\infty}_{m=1} (-1)^{m+1}x^{-m} \quad (x \to \infty) \\
\dfrac{1}{(1+x)}&\sim \sum^{\infty}_{m=1} (x-1)x^{-2m} \quad (x \to \infty)
\end{aligned}$$

=== Sector of validity ===
In complex analysis, the limit of a function as it approaches a point in the complex plane may depend on the path's direction. Therefore, it is necessary to specify the sector of validity, a wedge-shaped region where the function has a specified limit. The sector of validity's angular width is called its opening angle and its boundaries are rays whose angles are given by the $\arg(x)$ function. For complex-variable functions, a complete description of a divergent asymptotic series must specify its sector of validity, as this region varies by series.

=== Nonunique function ===
If the function $f(x)$ has this power series expansion:

$$f(x) \sim \sum^{\infty}_{m=0} a_{m} x^{m} \quad (x \to 0),$$

adding an exponential term, $e^{-\frac{1}{x^{2}}}$, leads to the same expansion as $x \to 0$ along the real axis:

$$f(x) + e^{-\frac{1}{x^{2}}} \sim \sum^{\infty}_{m=0} a_{m} x^{m} \quad (x \to 0).$$

This occurs because the exponential function's own Taylor coefficients at the origin all vanish. Thus, two distinct functions can share the exact same asymptotic expansion.

=== Subdominance ===
If two functions are equivalent $f(x) \sim g(x)$ as $x \to x_0$ within a sector of validity, their difference $\delta(x) = f(x) - g(x)$ is subdominant to both functions. A function subdominant in one sector may become dominant in a neighboring sector, a process associated with the Stokes phenomenon..

== Examples ==
Plots of the absolute value of the fractional error in the asymptotic expansion of the Gamma function (left). The horizontal axis is the number of terms in the asymptotic expansion. Blue points are for $x=2$ and red points are for $x=3$. It can be seen that the least error is encountered when there are 14 terms for $x=2$, and 20 terms for $x=3$, beyond which the error diverges.

- Gamma function (Stirling's approximation):

$$\frac{e^x}{x^x\sqrt{2\pi x}} \Gamma(x+1) \sim 1+\frac{1}{12x}+\frac{1}{288x^2}-\frac{139}{51840x^3}-\cdots, \ (x \to \infty), \, \text{for }|\arg (x)|< \pi.$$

- Exponential integral:

$$x e^x E_1(x) \sim \sum_{n=0}^\infty \frac{(-1)^nn!}{x^n}, \ (x \to \infty), \, \text{for } |\arg (x)| < \pi.$$

- Logarithmic integral for real variable $x$:

$$\operatorname{li}(x) \sim \frac{x}{\ln x} \sum_{k=0}^{\infty} \frac{k!}{(\ln x)^k}, \, (x \to \infty).$$

- Riemann zeta function:

$$\zeta(s) \sim \sum_{n=1}^{N}n^{-s} + \frac{N^{1-s}}{s-1} - \frac{N^{-s}}{2} + N^{-s} \sum_{m=1}^\infty \frac{B_{2m} s^{\overline{2m-1}}}{(2m)! N^{2m-1}}, \, \text{for } |\arg (s)|< \pi, \, \operatorname{Re}(s)>-2n,  \, n=1,2,3, \ldots$$
where $B_{2m}$ are Bernoulli numbers and $s^{\overline{2m-1}}$ is a rising factorial. This expansion is valid for all complex $s$ and is often used to compute the zeta function by using a large enough value of $N$, for instance $N > \vert s \vert.$

- Complementary error function:

$$\sqrt{\pi}x e^{x^2}{\rm erfc}(x) \sim 1+\sum_{n=1}^\infty (-1)^n \frac{(2n-1)!!}{(2x^2)^n} \ (x \to \infty), \, \text{for } |\arg (x)| < \frac{3\pi}{4}$$
where $(2n-1)!!$ is the double factorial.

== Worked example ==
This example generates an asymptotic expansion for a function related to the exponential integral defined using the Cauchy principal value (PV):

$$e^{-1/t}\operatorname{Ei}\left(\frac{1}{t}\right)= -e^{-1/t} \operatorname{PV} \int_{-\frac{1}{t}}^{\infty} \frac{e^{-u}}{u} \, du.$$

The substitution $w = ut + 1$ transforms this expression into:

$$e^{-1/t}\operatorname{Ei}\left(\frac{1}{t}\right) = \operatorname{PV} \int_{0}^{\infty} \frac{e^{-w/t}}{1-w} \, dw.$$

Applying the finite geometric series formula to the integrand's denominator expresses the function as a sum of integrals:

$$e^{-1/t}\operatorname{Ei}\left(\frac{1}{t}\right) = \sum_{m=0}^{n-1} \int_{0}^{\infty} w^{m}e^{-w/t} \, dw + \operatorname{PV} \int_{0}^{\infty} \frac{w^{n}e^{-w/t}}{1-w} \, dw.$$

Evaluating these integrals generates a finite series with factorial coefficients and an integral remainder:

$$e^{-1/t}\operatorname{Ei}\left(\frac{1}{t}\right) = \sum_{m=0}^{n-1} m! \, t^{m+1} + \operatorname{PV} \int_{0}^{\infty} \frac{w^{n}e^{-w/t}}{1-w} \, dw.$$

Although the series is divergent, truncating the series may provide a good approximation of the exponential integral for sufficiently small $t$.

The full asymptotic expansion includes all series terms:

$$e^{-1/t}\operatorname{Ei}\left(\frac{1}{t}\right) \sim \sum_{m=0}^{\infty} m! \, t^{m+1} \quad (t \to 0^+).$$

Repeated integration by parts is an alternative method to derive this identical expansion. Substituting $x=-\tfrac{1}{t}$ and noting that $\operatorname{Ei}(x)=-E_{1}(-x)$ recovers the expansion given earlier in the article:

$$\operatorname{Ei}(x) = \frac{e^{x}} {x} \left (\sum _{m=0}^{n} \frac{m!} {x^{m}} + e_{n}(x)\right), \quad e_{n}(x) \equiv (n + 1)!\ xe^{-x}\int_{ -\infty }^{x} \frac{e^{t}} {t^{n+2}}\,dt.$$

For any fixed $x$, the absolute value of the error term $|e_n(x)|$ decreases, then increases as $n$ increases. The minimum occurs at $n \sim \vert x \vert$, at which point $\textstyle \vert e_{n}(x)\vert \leq \sqrt{\frac{2\pi } {\vert x\vert }}e^{-\vert x\vert }$. Exponentially small truncation errors are common for optimally truncated series.

Asymptotic expansions may arise when a series is integrated beyond its boundary of convergence.

== Regularization methods ==
=== Optimal truncation ===
These regularization methods assign a value to an asymptotic series using truncated series.

The superasymptotic expansion is the truncated series which minimizes the magnitude of the remainder term. A remainder formula or remainder upper bound formula may determine the optimal truncation index $n$. If an exact formula is unavailable, heuristic methods may determine the optimum truncation index such as truncating the series immediately before or at its minimum term (summation to the least term), or using formulas that determine the optimal index $n$ from the value of the asymptotic variable $x$.

A term $\delta(x)$ is said to lie beyond-all-orders of an asymptotic expansion if the term is asymptotically smaller than every gauge function $\varphi_{n}(x)$ of the expansion:

$$\delta(x) = o(\varphi_{n}(x)) \quad (x \to L).$$

Commonly, an optimally truncated power series expansion at the origin has a beyond-all-orders truncation error of order $O(e^{-q/x})$ with positive constant $q$ as $x \to 0$ in the sector $|\arg(x)| < \pi/2$. At the origin, this truncation error is non-analytic and cannot be expressed as a Taylor series. The term asymptotics beyond-all-orders refers to the collection of methods used to measure the effects of these beyond all order terms.

For an alternating series, the remainder is often approximately half of the series' least term. Adding half of the least term to the sum of the preceding terms often generates a highly accurate approximation.

The hyperasymptotic expansion replaces the remainder of a superasymptotic expansion with an optimally truncated second series and second smaller remainder, often using a different scale. Repeating this process generates exponentially smaller remainder terms.

=== Summation of the series tail ===
These regularization methods compute a series remainder by applying Borel summation or Mellin-Barnes regularization to the series tail. The expansion's underlying function is the sum of this computed remainder and the truncated series.

==== Borel summation ====
When a truncated series has a factorially divergent tail, Borel summation evaluates the remainder as the product of the tail's first term and an integral called a terminant.

For an alternating-sign tail:

$$\sum^{\infty}_{m=n} \Gamma(m+\alpha+1)(-x)^{m}, \quad 0\leq \alpha <1, \, |\arg(x)| < \pi,$$

Borel summation generates a type I terminant $\Lambda_{s}(x)$, defined by a Cauchy principal value integral:

$$\Lambda_{s}(x) = \frac{1}{\Gamma(s+1)} \operatorname{PV} \int_{0}^{\infty} \frac{t^{s}e^{-t}}{1+xt} \, dt.$$

Multiplying this terminant by the tail's first term generates the exact remainder:

$$\Gamma(n+\alpha+1)(-x)^{n}\Lambda_{n+\alpha}(x).$$

For a same-sign tail:

$$\sum^{\infty}_{m=n} \Gamma (m+\alpha+1)x^{m}, \quad 0\leq \alpha <1,$$

the positive real axis forms a Stokes line. Borel summation generates a type II terminant $\bar{\Lambda}_{s}(-x)$ with the Stokes constant $S$:

$$\begin{aligned}
&\bar{\Lambda}_{s}(-x)=\Lambda_{s}(-x) +2S \dfrac{i\pi x^{-s-1}e^{-1/x}}{\Gamma(s+1)}, \\
&S= \begin{cases}
+\dfrac{1}{2}, & \text{if } 0 < \arg (x) < 2\pi, \\
0, & \text{if } \arg (x) = 0, \\
-\dfrac{1}{2}, & \text{if } -2\pi < \arg (x) < 0.
\end{cases}
\end{aligned}$$

The resulting remainder is the product:

$$\Gamma (n+\alpha+1)x^{n}\bar{\Lambda}_{n+\alpha}(-x).$$

For more general divergent tails, a linear combination of late-series terms and terminants, called a distribution over basic terminants, represents the remainder.

==== Mellin–Barnes tail regularization ====
Mellin–Barnes regularization evaluates the series tail separately for alternating-sign coefficients and same-sign coefficients.

For an alternating-sign series tail:

$$\sum_{m=n}^{\infty}f(m)(-x^{\beta})^{m},$$

Mellin–Barnes regularization computes this remainder:

$$\int^{c+i\infty}_{c-i \infty} \frac{x^{\beta s}f(s)}{e^{-i\pi s}-e^{i\pi s}} \, ds, \quad \frac{-\pi-\varepsilon_{1}}{\beta}<\arg(x) < \frac{\pi+\varepsilon_{2}}{\beta},$$

where $n-1 < c=\operatorname{Re}(s) < n$. The asymptotic behavior of the integrand as $s$ approaches the limits of integration determines the constants $\varepsilon_{1}$ and $\varepsilon_{2}.$

For a same-sign series tail:

$$\sum_{m=n}^{\infty}f(m)(x^{\beta})^{m},$$

the positive real axis forms a Stokes line. For the sector above the Stokes line, the method generates this remainder:

$$\int_{c-i\infty}^{c+i\infty} \frac{x^{\beta s}e^{i\pi s}f(s)}{e^{-i\pi s}-e^{i\pi s}} \, ds + \frac{1}{2} \int_{c-i\infty}^{c+i\infty} x^{\beta s}f(s) \, ds, \quad 0<\arg(x) < \frac{2\pi-B}{\beta},$$

where $n-1 < c=\operatorname{Re}(s) < n.$

For the sector below the Stokes line, the remainder becomes:

$$\int_{c-i\infty}^{c+i\infty} \frac{x^{\beta s}e^{-i\pi s}f(s)}{e^{-i\pi s}-e^{i\pi s}} \, ds -\frac{1}{2} \int_{c-i\infty}^{c+i\infty} x^{\beta s}f(s) \, ds,  \quad \frac{-2\pi+A}{\beta}<\arg(x) < 0,$$

where $n-1 < c=\operatorname{Re}(s) < n.$ The asymptotic behavior of the integrand as $s$ approaches the limits of integration determines the constants $A$ and $B.$ Additional integrals, convergent in overlapping sectors, allow analytic continuation in the complex plane for both types of series.

=== Summation of the full series ===
This regularization method applies Borel summation or Mellin-Barnes regularization to the entire series. Computing the Borel sum of a typical Gevrey order 1 asymptotic series requires a Borel transform, analytic continuation, and a Laplace transform.

The Borel transform converts this divergent power series with zero radius of convergence into a convergent series with a nonzero radius of convergence called the Borel transformed series. A series acceleration method can accurately sum a slow converging series.

The analytic continuation of the Borel transformed series is the Borel transformed function. The Borel transformed function's domain now extends across the complex plane, excluding the function's singularities. Comparing the transformed series coefficients to established tables of function expansions and coefficient sequences may identify the analytic continuation as a special function, an integral representation, or a generating function. An alternative approach uses rational function approximation of the transformed series, guided by singularity analysis and conformal mapping. A bijective conformal map (uniform map) is especially effective for accurate approximation. In comparison to the Padé approximant, the Adaptive Antoulas–Anderson (AAA) algorithm is numerically more stable and less prone to generating spurious poles.

Finally, the Laplace transform converts the Borel transformed function to the Borel sum, a finite value assigned to the original divergent series.

== Convergent alternative expansions ==
Series such as inverse factorial series (or Nörlund series), binary rational inverse factorial series, or modified Hadamard series are alternatives to asymptotic expansions because they may converge for functions with divergent asymptotic series.

The inverse factorial series (or Nörlund series) with coefficients $c_{m}$ has the following form:
$$f(x) = c_0 + \sum_{m=1}^{\infty} \frac{c_m}{x(x+1)(x+2)\cdots(x+m-1)}.$$

A binary rational inverse factorial series uses a double summation over the coefficients $c_{k,m}$; it has the following form:
$$f(z) = \sum_{k=1}^{\infty} \sum_{m=0}^{\infty} \frac{c_{k, m}}{2^{km}} \frac{m!}{(2^k z + 1)^{m+1}}.$$
This binary rational variant typically converges more rapidly than the standard inverse factorial series.

A modified Hadamard series is a convergent series designed to overcome the divergence or slow convergence of traditional asymptotic expansions. Each term in the series has a normalized incomplete gamma function that can gradually decrease the magnitude of later terms. Selecting optimal integration intervals and rearranging how later terms are summed leads to high accuracy.

== See also ==
=== Related fields ===
- Asymptotic analysis
- Singular perturbation

=== Asymptotic methods ===
- Watson's lemma
- Mellin transform
- Laplace's method
- Stationary phase approximation
- Method of dominant balance
- Method of steepest descent

== Notes ==
=== References ===
- Ablowitz, Mark J.; Fokas, Athanassios S. (2003). Complex Variables: Introduction and Applications. Cambridge University Press. ISBN 978-1-139-43913-8.
- Aniceto, Inês; Başar, Gökçe; Schiappa, Ricardo (2019). "A primer on resurgent transseries and their asymptotics". Physics Reports. 809: 1–135. arXiv:1802.10441. Bibcode:2019PhR...809....1A. doi:10.1016/j.physrep.2019.02.003. ISSN 0370-1573.
- Apostol, T.M. (2010), "Zeta and Related Functions", in Olver, Frank W. J.; Lozier, Daniel M.; Boisvert, Ronald F.; Clark, Charles W. (eds.), NIST Handbook of Mathematical Functions, Cambridge University Press, ISBN 978-0-521-19225-5, MR 2723248.
- Balser, Werner (2006). From Divergent Power Series to Analytic Functions: Theory and Application of Multisummable Power Series. Springer. ISBN 978-3-540-48594-0.
- Barbeau, E.J.; Leah, P.J. (1976). "Euler's 1760 paper on divergent series". Historia Mathematica. 3 (2): 141–160. doi:10.1016/0315-0860(76)90030-6.
- Barbeau, E. J. (1979). "Euler Subdues a very Obstreperous Series" (PDF). American Mathematical Monthly. 86 (5): 356–372. doi:10.1080/00029890.1979.11994809.
- Bayes, Thomas (1763). "A letter from the late Reverend Mr. Thomas Bayes, F. R. S. to John Canton, M. A. and F. R. S.". Philosophical Transactions of the Royal Society of London. 53: 269–271.
- Bender, Carl M.; Orszag, Steven A. (1978). Advanced Mathematical Methods for Scientists and Engineers. McGraw-Hill. ISBN 978-0-07-004452-4.
- Berry, Michael Victor; Howls, C. J. (1991). "Hyperasymptotics for integrals with saddles". Proceedings of the Royal Society of London. Series A. Mathematical and Physical Sciences. 434 (1892): 657–675. Bibcode:1991RSPSA.434..657B. doi:10.1098/rspa.1991.0119. ISSN 0962-8444.
- Bleistein, Norman; Handelsman, Richard A. (1986). Asymptotic Expansions of Integrals. Courier Corporation. ISBN 978-0-486-65082-1.
- Borinsky, Michael (2018). Graphs in Perturbation Theory: Algebraic Structure and Asymptotics. Springer. ISBN 978-3-030-03541-9.
- Boyd, John P. (1999). "The Devil's Invention: Asymptotic, Superasymptotic and Hyperasymptotic Series". Acta Applicandae Mathematica. 56 (1): 1–98. Bibcode:1999AcAM...56....1B. doi:10.1023/A:1006145903624. ISSN 1572-9036.
- Boyd, John P. (2012). Weakly Nonlocal Solitary Waves and Beyond-All-Orders Asymptotics: Generalized Solitons and Hyperasymptotic Perturbation Theory. Springer US. ISBN 978-1-4613-7670-5.
- Breitung, Karl W. (2006). Asymptotic Approximations for Probability Integrals. Springer. ISBN 978-3-540-49033-3.
- Caliceti, E.; Meyer-Hermann, M.; Ribeca, P.; Surzhykov, A.; Jentschura, U. D. (2007). "From useful algorithms for slowly convergent series to physical predictions based on divergent perturbative expansions". Physics Reports. 446 (1): 1–96. arXiv:0707.1596. Bibcode:2007PhR...446....1C. doi:10.1016/j.physrep.2007.03.003. ISSN 0370-1573.
- Carrier, George F.; Krook, Max; Pearson, Carl E. (2005). Functions of a Complex Variable: Theory and Technique. SIAM. ISBN 978-0-89871-595-8.
- Copson, E. T. (2004). Asymptotic Expansions. Cambridge University Press. ISBN 978-0-521-60482-6.
- Costin, Ovidiu (2008). Asymptotics and Borel Summability. CRC Press. p. 17. ISBN 978-1-4200-7032-3.
- Costin, Ovidiu; Dunne, Gerald V (2018). "Convergence from divergence". Journal of Physics A: Mathematical and Theoretical. 51 (4): 04LT01. arXiv:1705.09687. Bibcode:2018JPhA...51dLT01C. doi:10.1088/1751-8121/aa9e30.
- Costin, Ovidiu; Dunne, Gerald V. (2021). "Conformal and uniformizing maps in Borel analysis". The European Physical Journal Special Topics. 230 (12): 2679–2690. arXiv:2108.01145. Bibcode:2021EPJST.230.2679C. doi:10.1140/epjs/s11734-021-00267-x. ISSN 1951-6401.
- Crew, Samuel; Trinh, Philippe H. (2024). "Resurgent aspects of applied exponential asymptotics". Studies in Applied Mathematics. 152 (3): 974–1025. doi:10.1111/sapm.12660. ISSN 0022-2526.
- de Bruijn, N. G. (1981). Asymptotic Methods in Analysis. Dover Publications. ISBN 9780486642215.
- De Jager, E.M.; Furu, Jiang (1996). "2 Asymptotic expansions". North-Holland Series in Applied Mathematics and Mechanics, Volume 42: The Theory of Singular Perturbations. Vol. 42. North-Holland. pp. 9–25. ISBN 9780444821706.
- Dingle, R. B. (1973). Asymptotic Expansions: Their Derivation and Interpretation. Academic Press.
- Dorigoni, Daniele (2019). "An introduction to resurgence, trans-series and alien calculus". Annals of Physics. 409: 167914. doi:10.1016/j.aop.2019.1079144 (inactive 8 November 2026). ISSN 0003-4916.
- Dunne, Gerald V (2026). "Introductory lectures on resurgence". The European Physical Journal Special Topics, Online First. 235 (17): 3891–3938. arXiv:2511.15528. doi:10.1140/epjs/s11734-026-02135-y.
- Ehrenpreis, Leon (2008). "The Borel transform". Algebraic Analysis of Differential Equations: from Microlocal Analysis to Exponential Asymptotics Festschrift in Honor of Takahiro Kawai. Springer Japan. pp. 119–131. doi:10.1007/978-4-431-73240-2_12. ISBN 978-4-431-73240-2.
- Erdélyi, Arthur (2012). Asymptotic Expansions. Courier Corporation. ISBN 978-0-486-15505-0.
- Estrada, Ricardo; Kanwal, Ram P. (2012). Asymptotic Analysis: A Distributional Approach. Springer Science & Business Media. ISBN 978-1-4684-0029-8.
- Fasondini, M.; Hale, N.; Spoerer, R; Weideman, J.A.C. (2019). "Quadratic Pade approximation : numerical aspects and applications". Computer Research and Modeling. 11 (6): 1017–1031. doi:10.20537/2076-7633-2019-11-6-1017-1031.
- Flajolet, Philippe; Sedgewick, Robert (15 January 2009). Analytic Combinatorics. Cambridge University Press. ISBN 978-1-139-47716-1.
- Fruchard, Augustin; Schafke, Reinhard (2012). Composite Asymptotic Expansions. Springer. ISBN 978-3-642-34035-2.
- Hardy, Godfrey H. (2024). Divergent Series. American Mathematical Society. ISBN 978-1-4704-7785-1.
- Howison, Sam (2005). Practical Applied Mathematics: Modelling, Analysis, Approximation. Cambridge University Press. ISBN 978-0-521-84274-7.
- Jahnke, Hans Niels (2003). A history of analysis. History of mathematics. Providence (R.I.): American mathematical society. p. 190. ISBN 978-0-8218-2623-2.
- Jones, James P.; Kiss, Peter (1992). "Linear recursive sequences and power series". Publ. Math. Debrecen. 41 (3–4): 295–306. doi:10.5486/PMD.1992.1207.
- Kowalenko, Victor (2009). The Stokes Phenomenon, Borel Summation and Mellin-Barnes Regularisation. Bentham Science Publishers. ISBN 978-1-60805-010-9.
- Kowalenko, Victor (2011). "Euler and Divergent Series". European Journal of Pure and Applied Mathematics. 4 (4): 370–423. ISSN 1307-5543.
- Kress, Rainer (2012). Linear Integral Equations. Springer Science & Business Media. ISBN 978-3-642-97146-4.
- Mera, Héctor; Pedersen, Thomas G.; Nikolić, Branislav K. (30 May 2018). "Fast summation of divergent series and resurgent transseries from Meijer-approximants". Physical Review D. 97 (10) 105027. arXiv:1802.06034. Bibcode:2018PhRvD..97j5027M. doi:10.1103/PhysRevD.97.105027. ISSN 2470-0010.
- Miller, P. D. (2006). Applied Asymptotic Analysis. American Mathematical Society. ISBN 9780821840788.
- Murray, J. D. (2012). Asymptotic Analysis. Springer Science & Business Media. ISBN 978-1-4612-1122-8.
- Olde Daalhuis, Adri (2004). "Inverse factorial-series solutions of difference equations". Proceedings of the Edinburgh Mathematical Society. 47 (2): 421–448. doi:10.1017/S0013091503000609. ISSN 1464-3839.
- Olde Daalhuis, Adri (2010), "Hypergeometric function", in Olver, Frank W. J.; Lozier, Daniel M.; Boisvert, Ronald F.; Clark, Charles W. (eds.), NIST Handbook of Mathematical Functions, Cambridge University Press, ISBN 978-0-521-19225-5, MR 2723248.
- Olver, Adri; Wong (2010), "Gamma function", in Olver, Frank W. J.; Lozier, Daniel M.; Boisvert, Ronald F.; Clark, Charles W. (eds.), NIST Handbook of Mathematical Functions, Cambridge University Press, ISBN 978-0-521-19225-5, MR 2723248.
- Olver, F. W. J. (1974). Introduction to Asymptotics and Special Functions. Academic Press. ISBN 978-1-4832-6708-1.
- O'Malley, Robert E. (2014). "Asymptotic Approximations". In O'Malley, Robert E. (ed.). Historical Developments in Singular Perturbations. Cham: Springer International Publishing. pp. 27–51. doi:10.1007/978-3-319-11924-3_2. ISBN 978-3-319-11924-3.
- Paris, R.B. (2010), "Incomplete Gamma and Related Functions", in Olver, Frank W. J.; Lozier, Daniel M.; Boisvert, Ronald F.; Clark, Charles W. (eds.), NIST Handbook of Mathematical Functions, Cambridge University Press, ISBN 978-0-521-19225-5, MR 2723248.
- Paris, R. B.; Kaminsky, D. (2001). Asymptotics and Mellin-Barnes Integrals. Cambridge University Press. doi:10.1017/CBO9780511546662. ISBN 978-0-521-79001-7.
- Paulsen, William (2013). Asymptotic Analysis and Perturbation Theory. CRC Press. ISBN 978-1-4665-1512-3.
- Paris, R. B. (2011). Hadamard Expansions and Hyperasymptotic Evaluation: An Extension of the Method of Steepest Descents. Cambridge University Press. ISBN 978-1-107-00258-6.
- Poincaré, Henri (1892). "Chapitre VII. Solutions asymptotiques". Les méthodes nouvelles de la mécanique céleste Tome I (PDF). Paris: Gauthier-Villars. pp. 335–382.
- Poincaré, Henri (1886). "Sur les intégrales irrégulières: Des équations linéaires" (PDF). Acta Math. 8: 295–344. doi:10.1007/BF02417092.
- Remy, Pascal (2024). Asymptotic Expansions and Summability. Application to Partial Differential Equations. Lecture Notes in Mathematics. Vol. 2351. Springer. doi:10.1007/978-3-031-59094-8. ISBN 978-3-031-59093-1.
- Segur, Harvey; Tanveer, Saleh; Levine, Herbert (1991). Asymptotics beyond All Orders. New York: Plenum Press. doi:10.1007/978-1-4757-0435-8. ISBN 978-1-4757-0437-2.
- Sloane, N. J. A. (2014). A Handbook of Integer Sequences. Academic Press. ISBN 978-1-4832-6467-7.
- Spivak, Michael (2008). Calculus. Publish or Perish. pp. 471–472. ISBN 978-0-914098-91-1.
- Stieltjes, T.J. (1886). "Recherches sur quelques series semi-convergentes" (PDF). Annales Scientifiques de l'École Normale Supérieure, Ser. 3, Band 3. 3: 201–258. doi:10.24033/asens.279.
- Temme, Nico M. (2015). Asymptotic Methods For Integrals. World Scientific. ISBN 978-981-4612-17-3.
- Temme, N.M. (2010), "Exponential, Logarithmic, Sine, and Cosine Integrals", in Olver, Frank W. J.; Lozier, Daniel M.; Boisvert, Ronald F.; Clark, Charles W. (eds.), NIST Handbook of Mathematical Functions, Cambridge University Press, ISBN 978-0-521-19225-5, MR 2723248.
- Temme, N.M. (2010), "Error Functions, Dawson's and Fresnel Integrals", in Olver, Frank W. J.; Lozier, Daniel M.; Boisvert, Ronald F.; Clark, Charles W. (eds.), NIST Handbook of Mathematical Functions, Cambridge University Press, ISBN 978-0-521-19225-5, MR 2723248.
- Temme, N.M. (2010), "Exponential, Logarithmic, Sine, and Cosine Integrals", in Olver, Frank W. J.; Lozier, Daniel M.; Boisvert, Ronald F.; Clark, Charles W. (eds.), NIST Handbook of Mathematical Functions, Cambridge University Press, ISBN 978-0-521-19225-5, MR 2723248.
- van Boven, Hasse; Wesselink, Rob; Wepster, Steven (2012). "Asymptotic series of Poincaré and Stieltjes" (PDF). Nieuw Archief voor Wiskunde. 5. 13 (3): 187–190.
- Trefethen, Lloyd N. (2023). "Numerical analytic continuation". Japan Journal of Industrial and Applied Mathematics. 40 (3): 1587–1636. doi:10.1007/s13160-023-00599-2. ISSN 1868-937X.
- Van Den Berg, I.P. (2008). "Asymptotic Solutions of nonlinear difference equations". Annales de la Faculté des sciences de Toulouse : Mathématiques. 17 (3): 635–660. doi:10.5802/afst.1196. ISSN 2258-7519.
- Verhulst, Ferdinand (2006). Methods and Applications of Singular Perturbations: Boundary Layers and Multiple Timescale Dynamics. Springer Science & Business Media. ISBN 978-0-387-28313-5.
- Weniger, Ernst Joachim (2010). "Summation of divergent power series by means of factorial series". Applied Numerical Mathematics. 60 (12): 1429–1441. arXiv:1005.0466. doi:10.1016/j.apnum.2010.04.003.
- White, R. B. (2010). Asymptotic Analysis of Differential Equations. World Scientific. ISBN 978-1-84816-607-3.
- Whittaker, E. T.; Watson, G. N. (2021). A Course of Modern Analysis. Cambridge University Press. ISBN 978-1-009-00859-4.
- Wimp, Jet (1984). Computation with Recurrence Relations. Boston, MA: Pitman.
- Wong, Roderick (1989). Asymptotic Approximations of Integrals. Academic Press. ISBN 978-0-12-762535-5.
- Yasutaka, Sibuya (1975). Global Theory of a Second Order Linear Ordinary Differential Equation with a Polynomial Coefficient. Elsevier. ISBN 978-0-08-087129-5.
