= Supersymmetric WKB approximation =

Mathematical method in quantum-mechanics

In physics, the supersymmetric WKB (SWKB) approximation is an extension of the WKB approximation that uses principles from supersymmetric quantum mechanics to provide estimations on energy eigenvalues in quantum-mechanical systems. Using the supersymmetric method, there are potentials $V(x)$ that can be expressed in terms of a superpotential, $W(x)$, such that

$$V(x) = W^2(x)-\frac{\hbar}{\sqrt{2m}} W'(x)$$

The SWKB approximation then writes the Born–Sommerfeld quantization condition from the WKB approximation in terms of $W(x)$.

The SWKB approximation for unbroken supersymmetry, to first order in $\hbar$ is given by

$$\frac{1}{\hbar}\int_b^a dx \, \sqrt{2m(E_n-W^2(x))} = n\pi$$

where $E_n$ is the estimate of the energy of the $n$-th excited state, and $a$ and $b$ are the classical turning points, given by

$$W^2(a) = W^2(b) = E_n$$

The addition of the supersymmetric method provides several appealing qualities to this method. First, it is known that, by construction, the ground state energy will be exactly estimated. This is an improvement over the standard WKB approximation, which often has weaknesses at lower energies. Another property is that a class of potentials known as shape invariant potentials have their energy spectra estimated exactly by this first-order condition.

== See also ==
- Quantum mechanics
- Supersymmetric quantum mechanics
- Supersymmetry
- WKB approximation
