= Borel transform =

In mathematics, Borel transform may refer to

- A transform used in Borel summation
- A generalization of this in Nachbin's theorem
