= Maurice Gevrey =

French mathematician

Maurice-Joseph Gevrey (13 March 1884 in Fauverney, Côte d'or, France – 19 September 1957 in Fauverney) was a French mathematician. In 1918, he introduced what are now called Gevrey classes. From 1919, he worked on partial differential equations at the University of Burgundy, becoming a professor in 1920.
