= Gevrey class =

In mathematics, the Gevrey classes on a domain $\Omega\subseteq \R^n$, introduced by Maurice Gevrey, are spaces of functions 'between' the space of analytic functions $C^\omega(\Omega)$ and the space of smooth (infinitely differentiable) functions $C^\infty(\Omega)$. In particular, for $\sigma \ge 1$, the Gevrey class $G^\sigma (\Omega)$, consists of those smooth functions $g \in C^\infty(\Omega)$ such that for every compact subset $K \Subset \Omega$ there exists a constant $C$, depending only on $g, K$, such that

$$\sup_{x \in K} |D^\alpha g(x)| \le C^{|\alpha|+1}|\alpha!|^\sigma \quad \forall \alpha \in \Z_{\geq 0}^n$$

Where $D^\alpha$ denotes the partial derivative of order $\alpha$ (see multi-index notation).

When $\sigma = 1$, $G^\sigma(\Omega)$ coincides with the class of analytic functions $C^\omega(\Omega)$, but for $\sigma > 1$ there are compactly supported functions in the class that are not identically zero (an impossibility in $C^\omega$). It is in this sense that they interpolate between $C^\omega$ and $C^\infty$. The Gevrey classes find application in discussing the smoothness of solutions to certain partial differential equations: Gevrey originally formulated the definition while investigating the homogeneous heat equation, whose solutions are in $G^2(\Omega)$.

== Application ==
Gevrey functions are used in control engineering for trajectory planning. A typical example is the function

$$\Phi_{\omega,T}(t) =
\begin{cases}
0 & t \leq 0, \\
1 & t \geq T, \\
\frac{\int_{0}^{t} \Omega_{\omega,T}(\tau) d\tau}{\int_{0}^{T} \Omega_{\omega,T}(\tau) d\tau}  & t \in (0, T)
\end{cases}$$

with

$$\Omega_{\omega,T}(t) =
\begin{cases}
0 & t \notin [0,T], \\
\exp\left( \frac{-1}{\left([1 - \frac{t}{T}] ~ \frac{t}{T} \right)^{\omega}}  \right)  & t \in (0, T)
\end{cases}$$

and Gevrey order $\alpha = 1 + \frac{1}{\omega}.$

== See also ==
- Denjoy–Carleman theorem
